= Ray (surname) =

Origin
- Origin: Bengali Hindu
- Region of origin: Bengal

The surname Ray has several origins.

== Origin of the surname ==
In some cases it originates from a nickname, derived from the Old French rei, roy, meaning "king", which was sometimes also used as a personal name. This nickname may have denoted a person's pride or swagger, someone's appearance, or regal behavior or bearing, or may have referred to achievement in a contest, royal service, or may have denoted someone who presided over certain festive celebrations. Early examples of forms of this surname include: William Lerei, in 1195 (Norfolk); Robert Raie, in 1206 (Cambridgeshire); and Thomas filius Rey, in 1296 (Cambridgeshire).

In other cases, the surname originates from a nickname derived from the northern Middle English rā, rae, ray (Old English rā, Old Norse rā), meaning "roe deer", or the Middle English ray (Old English rœge), meaning "female roe deer". This nickname may have denoted a timid person or a swift runner.

In other cases, the surname is derived from the Scottish Gaelic Mac Raith, a surname derived from the Gaelic personal name Macraith, "son of grace". Early examples of forms of this surname include: Alexander Macrad, in about 1225 (Dunbartonshire); Patric McRe, in 1376 (Dumfriesshire); and Adam McCreich, in 1438.

In other cases, the surname is a variant of Rye. In such cases, the surname may originate from two locative names: one is derived from a form of the Middle English atter ye, "meaning at the island" (Old English œt thœre ige), for someone who lived on an island or a patch of firm ground; the other is derived from a form of the Middle English atter eye, meaning "at the river" (Old English œt thœre eœ) for someone who lived near a river or stream. Early examples of forms of the surname Rye include: William de Rye, in 1240 (Essex); Ralph de Rye, in 1248 (Essex); and Ralph de la Reye, in 1279 (Oxfordshire).

In other cases, the surname may be a variant of the surname Wray, a variant of Wroe, derived from the Middle English wroe (Old Scandinavian vrá), meaning "nook, corner of land". Early examples of forms of the surname Wray include: Willelmus del Wra, in 1379 (Lancashire); Ricardus del Wra, in 1377 (West Yorkshire); and Willelmus in the Wraa, in 1379 (West Yorkshire).

In other cases, the surname is of Ashkenazic Jewish origin. In other cases, the surname may have originated as locative name, derived from the Old French raier, meaning "to gush, stream, or pour". In other cases, the surname is a variant of Indian surname Rai. In some case, the surname Rai is derived from the Sanskrit raja, meaning "king". In other cases, specifically in Karnataka, the origin of the surname is unknown.

== People with this surname ==
- Adam E. Ray (1808–1865), American politician
- Adam Ray (comedian), American comedian and actor
- Adil Ray (born 1974), British radio and television presenter
- Aindrita Ray (born 1984), Indian film actress
- Ajit Ray, Indian politician
- A. N. Ray Ajit Nath Ray (1912–2010), Indian Bengali jurist
- Aldo Ray (1926–1991), American actor
- Allan Ray (born 1984), American professional basketball player
- Amy Ray (born 1964), American singer-songwriter, member of the Indigo Girls
- Andrew Ray (1939–2003), British actor
- Anna Chapin Ray (1865–1945), American author
- Annada Shankar Ray (1904–2002), Indian Bengali poet and essayist
- Antonia Rey (1927–2019), Cuban-born American actress
- Benjamin Ray (1819–?), American politician
- Bharatchandra Ray (1712–1760), Indian Bengali poet and composer
- Bill Ray (disambiguation), several people

- Bill Ray (bishop) (born 1950), Anglican bishop of North Queensland in Australia
- Bill Ray (politician) (1922–2013), American businessman, politician, and writer
- Bill Ray (photojournalist) (1936–2020), photojournalist

- Billy Ray (screenwriter), screenwriter, director, and producer
- Blaine Ray, American creator of TPR Storytelling
- Bob Ray, American filmmaker
- Bobby Ray (actor) (1899–1957), American comedian and film director
- Bobby Ray Parks Jr., Filipino professional basketball player
- Bonnie Ray, American statistician and data scientist
- Brian Ray (born 1955), American musician
- Charles Ray (Indiana judge) Charles A. Ray (1829–1912), American judge
- Charles W. Ray (1872–1959), American recipient of Medal of Honor
- Charlotte B. Ray (c. 1813 – 25 October 1891), American prominent suffragist and abolitionist
- Chris Ray (born 1982), American baseball pitcher
- Clifford Ray (born 1949), American basketball coach and former player
- Daniel Burrill Ray (1928–1979), American mathematician
- Danny Ray (singer) (born 1951), Jamaican-born reggae singer and record producer
- Danny Ray (saxophonist) (born 1951), American saxophonist
- David Parker Ray (1939–2002), American suspected serial killer (known as the "Toy-Box Killer")
- David Ray (poet) (1932-), American poet
- David R. Ray (1945–1969), United States Navy sailor
- Dave "Snaker" Ray (1943–2002), American blues singer and guitarist
- Dixy Lee Ray (1914–1994), American scientist and politician, former Governor of Washington
- Dorothy Jean Ray (1919–2007), American anthropologist
- Dwijendralal Ray (1863–1913), Indian Bengali poet, playwright, and musician
- Dylan Ray (born 2001), American baseball player
- Edgar Ray (1828–1905), founder of "Punch" magazines in Australia
- Elise Ray (born 1982), American gymnast
- Elizabeth Ray (born 1943), American model and sex scandal figure
- Elmer Ray (1911–1987), American heavyweight boxer
- Emmanuel Ray, Sri Lankan presenter and human rights activist
- Frank Edward "Ed" Ray (1921–2012), American bus driver hero in 1976 Chowchilla kidnapping
- Fred Olen Ray (born 1954), American director, producer, screenwriter, actor, and cinematographer
- Gabrielle Ray (1883–1973), British stage actress, dancer and singer
- Ganendra Narayan Ray (born 1933), Indian Bengali jurist
- Gene Ray, American, creator of website Time Cube
- Gene Anthony Ray (1962–2003), American actor, dancer, and choreographer
- George Augustus Ray (1819–1893), American politician
- Gordon Norton Ray (1915–1986), American biographer and professor of English
- Gourishankar Ray (1838–1917), Indian Odia language activist
- Greg Ray (born 1966), American IRL IndyCar Series driver
- Herbert J. Ray (1893–1970), American admiral
- Isaac Ray (1807–1881), American psychiatrist
- James Ray (disambiguation) several people, including:

- James B. Ray (1794–1848), American politician
- James Earl Ray (1928–1998), American convicted of assassinating Martin Luther King
- James Enos Ray Jr. (1874–1934), American politician
- James Ray (rock musician), rock musician, member of The Sisterhood and James Ray's Gangwar
- James Ray (singer) (1941–1964), African-American R&B singer

- Jamini Bhushan Ray (1879–1926), Indian Bengali physician, Sanskritist, and philanthropist
- Janisse Ray (born 1962), American writer, naturalist, and environmental activist
- Jean Ray (1941–2007), American folk singer of Jim and Jean duo
- Jean Ray, multiple people
- Jeremy Ray, Australian television presenter and video game reviewer
- Jimmy Ray (born 1970), British pop-rock musician
- Joe Ray, of Nero (musicians), British dubstep trio
- John Ray (1627–1705), British naturalist
- John H. Ray (1886–1975), American politician
- Johnnie Ray (1927–1990), American singer, songwriter, and pianist
- Johnny Ray (racing driver) (1937–2020), American NASCAR driver
- Johnny Ray (second baseman) (born 1957), American baseball player
- Joie Ray (athlete) (Joseph W. Ray; 1894–1978), American middle-distance runner
- Joie Ray (racing driver) (Joseph Reynolds Ray Jr.; 1923–2007), American race car driver
- Jonah Ray (born 1982), American actor, comedian and writer
- Joseph Ray (disambiguation), includes
  - Joseph Warren Ray (1849–1928), American politician
- Karen B. Ray, American politician
- Ken Ray (born 1974), American baseball pitcher
- LaBryan Ray (born 1997), American football player
- Larry Ray (born 1959), American criminal convicted of sex trafficking, extortion, forced labor, and other offenses, sentenced to 60 years in prison
- Lionel Ray (born 1935), French poet and essayist
- Lisa Ray (born 1972), Canadian actress and former model
- Little Ray, American musician
- Man Ray (1890–1976), American artist
- Manju Ray, Indian Bengali biochemist and cancer researcher
- Manmatha Ray (1899-1988), Bangladeshi playwright
- Mary Ruth Ray (1956–2013), American classical violist
- Mike Ray (1936–2021), Canadian politician
- Nicholas Ray (1911–1979), American filmmaker
- Niharranjan Ray (1903–1981), Indian Bengali historian
- Norman W. Ray (born 1942), American admiral
- Ola Ray (born 1960), American model and actress
- Prafulla Chandra Ray (1861–1944), Indian Bengali chemist, educator and entrepreneur
- Pratibha Ray (born 1943), Indian Odia writer
- Rabi Ray (1926–2017), Indian Odia politician, former speaker of Lok Sabha
- Rachael Ray (born 1968), American television personality, celebrity chef and author
- Radhanath Ray (1848–1908), Indian Odia poet
- Raja Sitaram Ray (1658–1714), Indian rebel king who fought against the Mughal Empire
- Ray brothers, American, three hemophiliac brothers diagnosed with HIV in 1986
- Reginald Ray, American Buddhist academic and Vajra Master
- Renuka Ray (1904–1997), Indian Bengali social activist
- Rex Ray, American fine artist and graphic designer
- Richard Ray (1927–1999), American politician
- Richie Ray (born 1945), American musician and minister of duo Richie Ray & Bobby Cruz
- Ricky Ray (born 1979), Canadian and American football quarterback
- Rob Ray (born 1968), Canadian sports broadcaster and former ice hockey player
- Robbie Ray (born 1991), American baseball pitcher
- Robbie Ray (racing driver), American racing driver
- Robert Ray (disambiguation), several people
- Robert D. Ray (1928–2018), Governor of Iowa 1969 to 1983

- Robert D. Ray (1978–2000), one of the Ray brothers (above)
- Robert R. Ray, Reconstruction era sheriff and state legislator in Feliciana, Louisiana
- Robert Ray (artist) (1924–2002), American artist
- Robert Ray (Australian politician) (born 1947), Labor Party Senator for Victoria
- Robert Ray (prosecutor) (born 1960), final Whitewater Special Counsel
- Robert Ray (baseball) (born 1984), baseball pitcher

- Robin Ray (1934–1998), British actor, musician and broadcaster
- Ronnie Ray (born 1954), American track and field athlete
- Ruth Ray (1919–1977), American artist
- Sandip Ray (born 1953), Indian Bengali filmmaker
- Satyajit Ray (1921–1992), Indian Bengali filmmaker
- Scottie Ray (born 1964), American voice actor
- Shannon Ray (born 1995), American sprinter
- Shawn Ray (born 1965) American author and former professional bodybuilder
- Sibnarayan Ray (1921–2008), Indian Bengali educationist, philosopher and literary critic
- Siddhartha Shankar Ray (1920–2010), chief minister of West Bengal and governor of Punjab
- Siddharth Ray (1963–2004), Indian Marathi actor
- Sidney Herbert Ray (1858–1939), American linguist
- Stevie Ray (born 1958), American wrestler
- Sukumar Ray (1887–1923), Indian Bengali nonsense poet, story writer and playwright
- Tanika Ray, American television personality
- Ted Ray (comedian) (1905–1977), British comedian
- Ted Ray (golfer) (1877–1943), British professional golfer
- Thomas S. Ray, American ecologist who created the Tierra project
- Traylon Ray (born 2005), American football player
- Upendrakishore Ray (1863–1915), Indian Bengali writer, painter, violinist and composer
- William Ray (disambiguation) several people, including

- Sir William Ray (British politician), Leader of London County Council, MP for Richmond
- William Ray (medicine) (1884–1953), academic in Adelaide, South Australia
- William H. Ray (1812–1881), United States Representative from Illinois
- William Hallett Ray (1825–1909), Canadian politician, farmer, and merchant
- William M. Ray (born 1963), American judge

- Wyatt Ray (born 1996), American football player

== Fictional characters ==
- Amuro Ray

== See also ==
- Del Ray (disambiguation)
- Le Ray (disambiguation)
- Leray
- Rae (surname)
- Rai (surname)
- Ray (given name)
- Rey (surname)
- Rhea (name)
- Roy
- Wray (surname)
