= Deputy Chair of the NATO Military Committee =

- Coat of arms

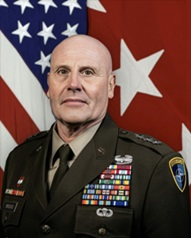
- Incumbent; Lieutenant General Winston P. Brooks Jr., USA since October 13, 2025
- NATO
- Abbreviation: DCMC
- Member of: NATO Military Committee
- Reports to: Chair of the NATO Military Committee, Deputy Secretary General
- Formation: 1967
- First holder: Lt Gen T. R. Milton
- Website: NATO

The Deputy Chair of the NATO Military Committee (abbr. DCMC) is the deputy head of the NATO Military Committee. Originally titled as the Deputy Chairman, the post was redesignated in 2021 to reflect the gender-neutrality of the post.

The current Deputy Chair of the NATO Military Committee is U.S. Army Lieutenant General Winston P. Brooks Jr.. He is the 25th Deputy Chair and took office on October 13, 2025.

== Role ==
The DCMC assists the Chair, advises the Deputy Secretary General and serves as the principal agent for coordination of nuclear, biological, and chemical matters for the Military Committee. Finally, in the Chair's absence, the Deputy Chair directs the daily operations and business of the Military Committee, NATO's highest military authority.

The Deputy Chair, always a US general or flag officer, serves the Alliance's Transatlantic bond. The position has access to U.S. nuclear information and a relationship with NATO's other member states, which allows the holder to provide military advice, especially pertaining to nuclear matters. While being a U.S. officer, the individual serves in an international capacity to represent the interests of the Alliance.

== History ==
A Chairman position was initially established without a Deputy, but as the command structure evolved and the demands on the Chairman increased, the need for a Deputy became obvious.

The Deputy's origins come from within the structure of the International Military Staff (IMS) as the 1963 Military Committee reforms provided the Director of the IMS a vice-director who held "special responsibilities for nuclear matters." This office was always an American to link the United States and NATO in nuclear strategy. Two dynamics served as the catalyst to establish the Deputy Chairman position on the Military Committee as it reflects today: 1. When the Chairman was away from Brussels, using a Military Representative within the Military Committee as a substitute proved unviable due to the conflict of simultaneously representing the interests of the Military Committee at large and one's own national interests and 2. the Military Committee did not want to create additional high-ranking officer positions to resolve the first issue. As a solution, the Military Committee elected to eliminate the Vice Director of the IMS position and simultaneously establish a new post of Deputy Chairman of the Military Committee. The Deputy position would still maintain the special responsibility for nuclear matters and remain a U.S. officer as established for the Vice-Director position. The NAC approved the proposal on January 6, 1967, to formally establish the position of Deputy Chairman of the Military Committee.

== List ==
Since the establishment of the Deputy Chairman position in 1967, there have been 9 from the Air Force, 5 from the Army, 4 from the Navy, and 2 from the Marine Corps. The deputy chairmen have been:

No.	Picture	Deputy Chairman of the NATO Military Committee	Took office	Left office	Time in office	Defence branch	Ref.
1	T. R. Milton	Lieutenant General; T. R. Milton (1915–2010)	March 1969	August 1971	2 years, 5 months	United States Air Force	
2	Edward Rowny	Lieutenant General; Edward Rowny (1917–2017)	August 1971	March 1973	1 year, 7 months	United States Army	.
3	Charles S. Minter	Vice Admiral; Charles S. Minter (1915–2008)	March 1973	August 1974	1 year, 5 months	United States Navy	.
4	Richard F. Schaefer	Lieutenant General; Richard F. Schaefer (born 1919)	August 1974	June 1975	10 months	United States Air Force	
5	Martin G. Colladay	Lieutenant General; Martin G. Colladay (1925–2003)	June 1975	August 1977	2 years, 2 months	United States Air Force	
6	George G. Cantlay	Lieutenant General; George G. Cantlay (1938–1999)	August 1977	August 1979	2 years	United States Army	
7	Lincoln D. Faurer	Lieutenant General; Lincoln D. Faurer (1928–2014)	August 1979	March 1981	1 year, 7 months	United States Air Force	.
8	Sinclair L. Melner	Lieutenant General; Sinclair L. Melner	June 1981	June 1984	3 years, 3 months	United States Army	.
9	Paul S. Williams Jr.	Lieutenant General; Paul S. Williams Jr. (1929–1995)	June 1984	May 1986	1 year, 11 months	United States Army	.
10	Jonathan T. Howe	Vice Admiral; Jonathan T. Howe (born 1935)	June 1986	June 1987	1 year	United States Navy	.
11	Robert D. Beckel	Lieutenant General; Robert D. Beckel (1937–2025)	June 1987	January 1990	2 years, 7 months	United States Air Force	
12	Charles P. Otstott	Lieutenant General; Charles P. Otstott (born 1937)	February 1990	June 1992	2 years, 5 months	United States Army	.
13	Norman W. Ray	Vice Admiral; Norman W. Ray (born 1942)	June 1992	November 1995	3 years, 5 months	United States Navy	.
14	Nicholas Kehoe	Lieutenant General; Nicholas Kehoe (1943–2022)	November 1995	September 1998	2 years, 10 months	United States Air Force	.
15	Michael J. Byron	Lieutenant General; Michael J. Byron (1941–2025)	September 1998	April 2001	2 years, 7 months	United States Marine Corps	
16	Malcolm I. Fages	Vice Admiral; Malcolm I. Fages (born 1946)	May 2001	April 2004	3 years	United States Navy	
17	Thomas L. Baptiste	Lieutenant General; Thomas L. Baptiste (born 1951)	April 2004	April 2007	3 years	United States Air Force	
18	Karl W. Eikenberry	Lieutenant General; Karl W. Eikenberry (born 1951)	April 2007	May 2009	2 years, 1 month	United States Army	.
19	Walter E. Gaskin	Lieutenant General; Walter E. Gaskin	May 2009	August 2013	4 years, 3 months	United States Marine Corps	.
20	Mark O. Schissler	Lieutenant General; Mark O. Schissler	August 2013	November 2016	3 years, 3 months	United States Air Force	
21	Steven M. Shepro	Lieutenant General; Steven M. Shepro	November 4, 2016	September 18, 2019	2 years, 10 months	United States Air Force	
22	Scott Kindsvater	Lieutenant General; Scott Kindsvater	September 18, 2019	October 1, 2021	2 years	United States Air Force	
23	Lance Landrum	Lieutenant General; Lance Landrum (born c. 1970)	October 11, 2021	September 21, 2023	1 year, 11 months	United States Air Force	
24	Andrew Rohling	Lieutenant General; Andrew Rohling (born c. 1967)	February 12, 2024	October 13, 2025	1 year, 8 months	United States Army	
25	Winston P. Brooks Jr.	Lieutenant General; Winston P. Brooks Jr.	October 13, 2025	Incumbent	11 months	United States Army	

== See also ==
- Chairman of the NATO Military Committee
- NATO Military Committee
- Chairman of the European Union Military Committee
- International Military Staff
- Supreme Allied Commander Europe
