= Robert Ray =

Robert, Rob, Robbie, Bob, or Bobby Ray may refer to:

- Robert D. Ray (1928–2018), governor of Iowa, 1969–1983
- Robert F. Ray (1935–2018), member of the Georgia House of Representatives
- Robert R. Ray, Reconstruction-era sheriff and state legislator in Feliciana, Louisiana
- Robert Ray (artist) (1924–2002), American artist
- Robert Ray (Australian politician) (born 1947)
- Robert Ray (prosecutor) (born 1960), final Whitewater Special Counsel
- Robert D. Ray (1978–2000), one of the Ray brothers
- Robert Ray (baseball) (born 1984), baseball pitcher
- Rob Ray (born 1968), retired Canadian ice hockey player
- Bob Ray, American filmmaker
- Robbie Ray (born 1991), American baseball pitcher
- Robbie Ray (racing driver), American racing driver
- Bobby Ray (actor), American film comedian of the silent era
- Bob Ray (javelin thrower) (born c. 1923), American javelin thrower, winner of the 1944 javelin throw at the NCAA Division I Outdoor Track and Field Championships

== See also ==
- Robert Rae (disambiguation)
- B.o.B (Bobby Ray Simmons, Jr.), American recording artist from Georgia
- Bobby Ray Parks Jr., Filipino professional basketball player
