= Robert Rae =

Robert Rae may refer to:

- Robert Rae (cricketer) (1912–1981), English cricketer
- Robert Rae (agricultural scientist) (1894–1971), Scottish agricultural scientist
- Bob Rae (born 1948), Canadian lawyer and politician

== See also ==
- Robert Ray (disambiguation)
