= Charles P. Otstott =

United States Army general

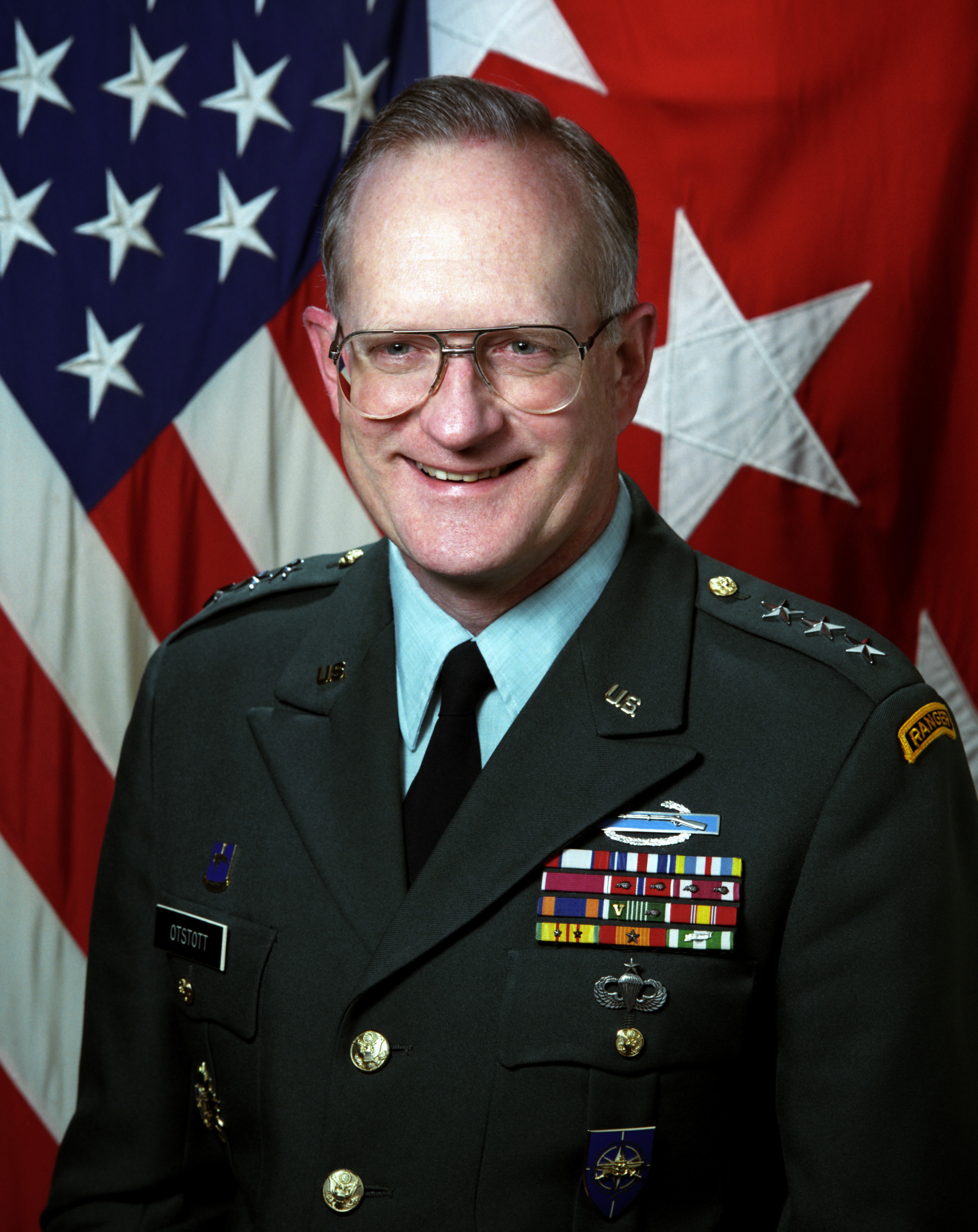
- Born: 2 June 1937 (age 89); Dallas, Texas U.S.
- Military career
- Allegiance: United States
- Branch: United States Army
- Service years: 1960–1992
- Rank: Lieutenant General
- Commands: 25th Infantry Division (Light);2nd Brigade, 9th Infantry Division; 1st Battalion, 46th Infantry Regiment, 1st Armored Division
- Conflicts: Vietnam War
- Awards: Defense Distinguished Service Medal; Distinguished Service Medal; Silver Star Medal; Defense Superior Service Medal; Legion of Merit; Bronze Star Medal (3); Meritorious Service Medal (3); Air Medal

Charles Paddock Otstott (born 2 June 1937) is a retired lieutenant general in the United States Army who served as Deputy Chairman of the NATO Military Committee from 1990 to 1992. He is a 1960 graduate of the United States Military Academy with a B.S. degree in engineering. Otstott later earned an M.S. degree in engineering from Purdue University in 1967. He is also a graduate of the Army Command and General Staff College and the National War College.

== Personal ==
In the 2024 United States presidential election, Otstott endorsed Kamala Harris.
