= Michael J. Byron (general) =

United States Marine Corps general

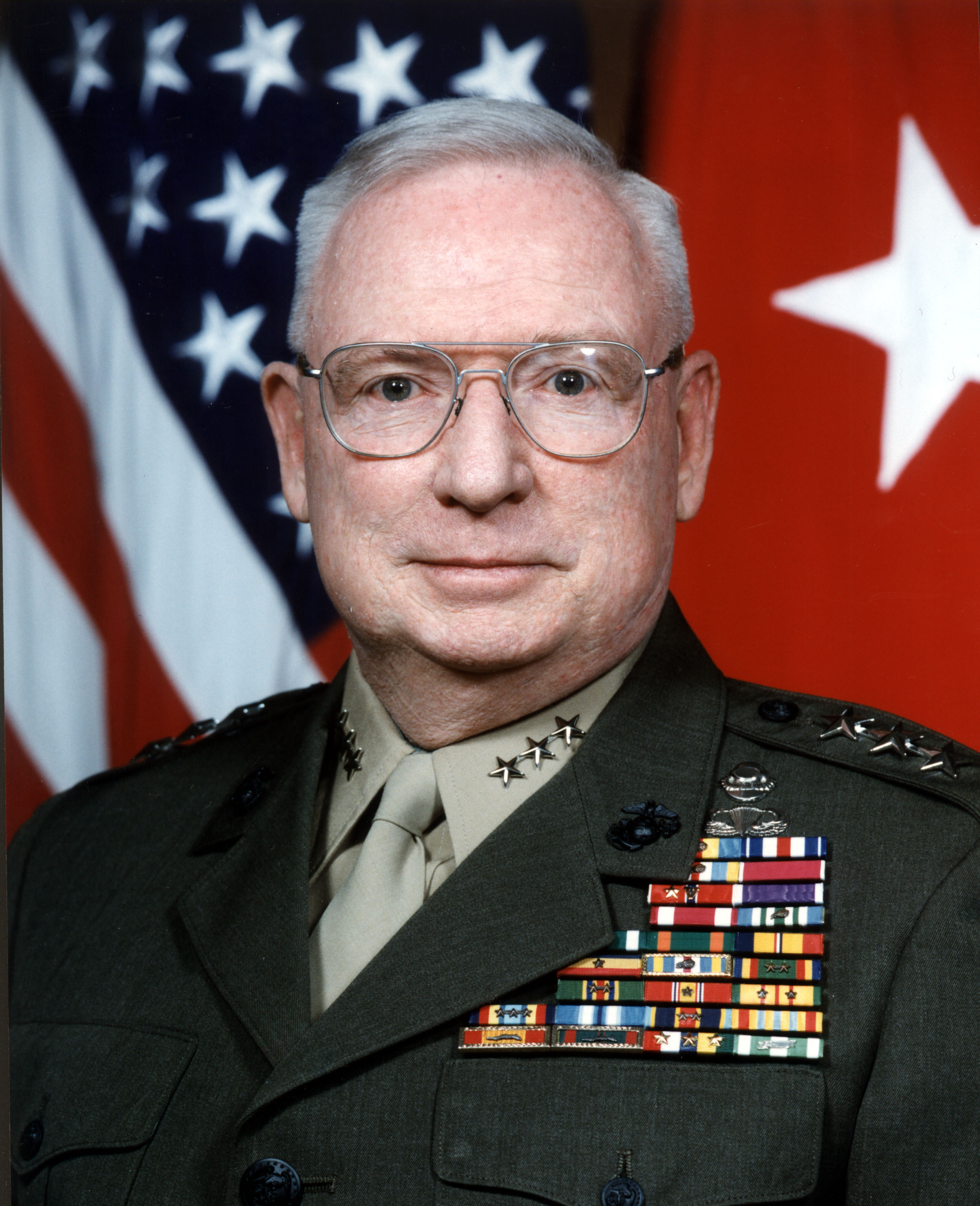
- Born: 1 October 1941; Albany, New York U.S.
- Died: 16 December 2025 (aged 84); Green Valley, Arizona, U.S.
- Military career
- Allegiance: United States
- Branch: United States Marine Corps
- Service years: 1963–2001
- Rank: Lieutenant general
- Service number: 0-88284

Michael J. Byron (1 October 1941 - 16 December 2025) was a retired lieutenant general in the United States Marine Corps who served Deputy Chairman of the NATO Military Committee from 1998 to 2001.

== Marine career ==
Bryon was commissioned in the United States Marine Corps as a second lieutenant in 1963 after graduation from University of Miami. He graduated from The Basic School at Marine Corps Base Quantico and served as Infantry Platoon Leader with 1st Battalion, 3rd Marines. Byron deployed to Vietnam in 1965. Byron was awarded the Silver Star Medal for valorous actions on 1 July 1965. Byron served a second tour in Vietnam in 1967 as rifle company commander. Byron later attended Amphibious Warfare School, and the Armed Forces Staff College. As a lieutenant colonel, Byron assumed command of 3rd Battalion, 4th Marines in 1978. Byron was promoted to colonel in 1984. Byron assumed command of 2nd Marines from Col. Harry W. Jenkins Jr. on June 9, 1986. Byron relinquished command to Colonel John W. Ripley on July 13, 1988.

His numerous staff assignments include director, InterAmerican Region (International Security Affairs), Office of the Secretary of Defense; the assistant to the Under Secretary of Defense for Policy, Office of the Secretary of Defense; and director for plans and policy (J-5) for the United States Atlantic Command; Branch Head, Western Regional Branch, Plans Division, Plans, Policies and Operations Department, Headquarters Marine Corps from June 1982 to June 1985; and vice director for strategic plans and policy, the Joint Staff, from January 1995 to August 1997. Upon promotion to major general, Byron served as commanding general, 3rd Marine Division from September 2, 1991, to September 1, 1993. His final assignment was United States Military Representative and then as the deputy chairman to the North Atlantic Treaty Organization (NATO) Military Committee, Brussels, Belgium from September 1997 to May 2001. Byron retired in 2001 after 38 years of service.

=== Silver Star citation ===
Citation:

The President of the United States of America takes pleasure in presenting the Silver Star to First Lieutenant Michael J. Byron (MCSN: 0-88284), United States Marine Corps, for conspicuous gallantry and intrepidity in action while serving as a Platoon Leader with Company A, First Battalion, Third Marines, THIRD Marine Division (Rein.), FMF, in connection with combat operations against the enemy in the Republic of Vietnam on 1 July 1965. While moving to an ambush site during the hours of darkness, the reinforced squad-size patrol suffered heavy casualties from the detonation of an enemy mine. Although injured himself, First Lieutenant Byron refused medical aid until all of his wounded men were treated. Attempted helicopter evacuation was driven off by extremely accurate and intense enemy small arms and automatic weapons fire. With half of his small force having become casualties and realizing the precarious situation he faced, First Lieutenant Byron called for and personally directed the reinforcement of his unit by the remainder of the platoon and other elements of the company. For over two hours, in spite of a disabling wound, he skillfully directed three separate units through terrain occupied by enemy ambush forces, successfully joining these units and subsequently withdrawing his forces to a safe area without incurring further casualties. Having seen to the evacuation of his dead and wounded men, First Lieutenant Byron remained with his men until ordered to be evacuated. By his daring actions and loyal devotion to duty in the face of personal risk, First Lieutenant Byron upheld the highest traditions of the United States Naval Service.

== Awards and decorations ==
U.S. military decorations
Defense Distinguished Service Medal with oak leaf cluster
Defense Superior Service Medal with oak leaf cluster
Silver Star Medal
Legion of Merit
Bronze Star Medal with Combat Distinguishing Device and gold award star
Purple Heart
Meritorious Service Medal
Navy Achievement Medal
Navy and Marine Corps Commendation Medal with Combat Distinguishing Device
Combat Action Ribbon
U.S. Unit Awards
Presidential Unit Citation with two bronze campaign stars
Joint Meritorious Unit Award
Navy Unit Commendation with three bronze campaign stars
Navy Meritorious Unit Commendation with three bronze campaign stars
U.S. Service (Campaign) Medals and Service and Training Ribbons
National Defense Service Medal with bronze service star
Armed Forces Expeditionary Medal
Vietnam Service Medal with four bronze service star
Sea Service Deployment Ribbon with three bronze service stars
Vietnam Gallantry Cross
Vietnam Civil Actions Medal
Vietnam Campaign Medal

U.S. badges, patches and tabs
Scuba Diver Badge
Navy and Marine Corps Parachutist Insignia
Rifle Expert Badge
Pistol Expert Badge
