= Steven M. Shepro =

United States Air Force general

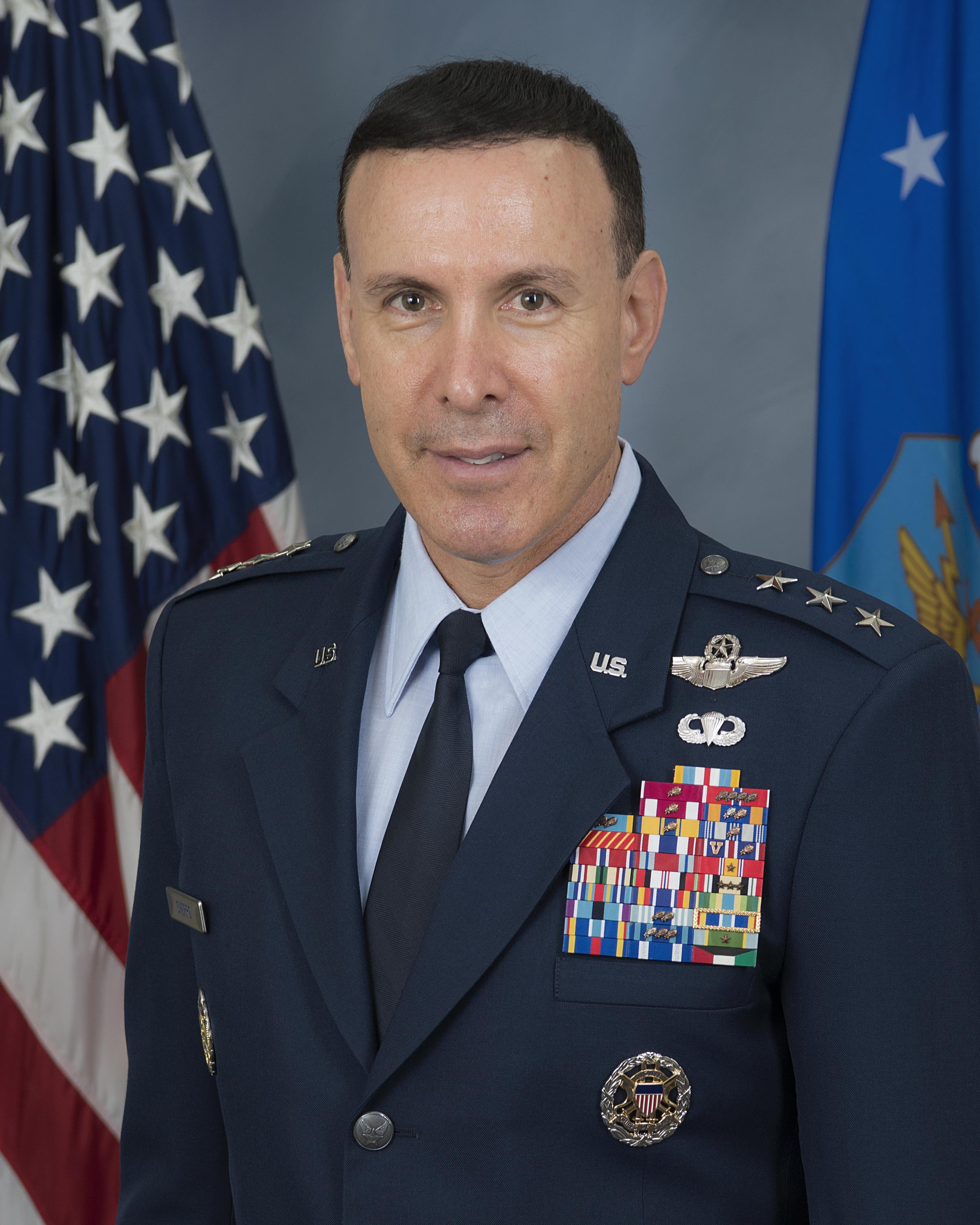
- Born: Hollywood, California, U.S.
- Military career
- Allegiance: United States
- Branch: United States Air Force
- Service years: 1984–2019
- Rank: Lieutenant general
- Commands: Deputy Chair of the NATO Military Committee; 438th Air Expeditionary Wing 316th Wing; 18th Air Support Operations Group 2nd Air Support Operations Squadron

Steven Michael Shepro is a former lieutenant general in the United States Air Force who served as the 21st deputy chairman of the North Atlantic Treaty Organization Military Committee., the 32-nation alliance's highest military authority.

Raised in Hollywood, California, General Shepro was commissioned in 1984 as a distinguished graduate (magna cum laude) of the U.S. Air Force Academy and is an Olmsted Scholar fluent in multiple languages. He is a command pilot with more than 3,000 flying hours in fighters, helicopters, and tactical airlift with over 600 combat hours in numerous operations. He commanded at operational squadron, group and wing levels, and led frontline Battlefield Airmen in Operation Iraqi Freedom. He served on the U.S. Joint Staff, Air Staff, and in Coalition Command and Combatant Command positions. General Shepro retired out of the Air Force in 2019.

In 2020, he joined Boeing and held several executive positions as Vice President of Fixed-Wing Aircraft, Global Sales & Marketing and Vice President Bombers & Fighters, Business Development for Boeing Defense, Space & Security, and was a member of Boeing's corporate Sustainability Council.

In 2023, Shepro joined Pratt & Whitney, and is currently Vice President of Integrated Customer Solutions, overseeing domestic and global business development of the company's defense sector. He is also a teaching fellow at SMU's Tower Center for Public Policy and International Affairs, a senior mentor for the NATO Defense College, a member of the Council on Foreign Relations, and a director of the Olmsted Foundation.

== Education ==
- 1984 Distinguished graduate, Bachelor of Science, U.S. Air Force Academy, Colorado
- 1990 Distinguished graduate, Squadron Officer School, Maxwell Air Force Base, Alabama
- 1995 Master's degree in International Affairs, Institut d'Etudes Politiques, Université de Strasbourg, France
- 1996 Air Command and Staff College, by correspondence
- 1999 Escuela Superior de Guerra Aérea, Buenos Aires, Argentina
- 2001 Air War College, by correspondence
- 2005 Master's degree in National Security, National War College, Washington, D.C.
- 2011 Senior Executive National and International Security Program, Harvard University, Massachusetts

== Assignments ==
- August 1984 - June 1985, student, undergraduate pilot training (helicopter), Fort Rucker, Alabama
- June 1985 - March 1987, H-1 pilot, 37th Air Rescue and Recovery Squadron, Warren AFB, Wyoming
- March 1987 - June 1988, H-1N weapons officer and instructor pilot, 67th Special Operations Squadron, Zaragoza Air Base, Spain
- June 1988 - December 1988, student, UPT (fixed wing conversion), Vance AFB, Oklahoma
- December 1988 - July 1991, A-10 flight commander, 509th Tactical Fighter Squadron, Royal Air Force Alconbury, England
- August 1991 - October 1992, A-10 flight commander and instructor pilot, 78th and 510th Tactical Fighter Squadrons, RAF Bentwaters, England
- October 1992 - September 1995, Olmsted Scholar, European Parliament and Council of Europe Intern, Strasbourg, France
- October 1995 - September 1997, F-16, weapons and tactics chief, 388th Fighter Wing, Hill AFB, Utah
- December 1997 - December 1998, student, Escuela Superior de Guerra Aérea, Argentina
- December 1998 - December 2001, chief of international fighter programs, Office of the Deputy Under Secretary of the Air Force (International Affairs), Washington, D.C.
- January 2002 - November 2002, director of operations, 52nd Operational Support Squadron, Spangdahlem Air Base, Germany
- November 2002 - June 2004, commander of 2nd Air Support Operations Squadron, Wurzburg, Germany
- July 2004 - June 2005, student, National War College, Fort Lesley J. McNair, Washington, D.C.
- July 2005 - May 2007, commander of 18th Air Support Operations Group, Pope AFB, North Carolina
- July 2007 - July 2008, vice commander of 332nd Air Expeditionary Wing, Balad Air Base, Iraq
- August 2008 - June 2010, commander of 316th Wing, and commander of Joint Base Andrews, Maryland
- July 2010 - July 2012, director for strategy, policy and plans (J5), Headquarters U.S. Southern Command, Miami, Florida
- August 2012 - August 2013, commanding general of NATO Air Training Command Afghanistan; and commander of 438th Air Expeditionary Wing, Kabul, Afghanistan
- September 2013 - June 2014, director of operations, deputy chief of staff for operations, plans and requirements (A3O), Headquarters U.S. Air Force, Washington, D.C.
- June 2014 - October 2016, vice director for strategic plans and policy (J5), Joint Staff, the Pentagon, Washington, D.C.
- November 2016 - present: deputy chairman of North Atlantic Treaty Organization Military Committee, Brussels, Belgium

== Summary of joint assignments ==
- November 2002 – June 2004, senior air liaison officer to 1st Infantry Division, Wurzburg, Germany (February 2003 – April 2003, senior air liaison officer to V Corps Assault Command, Iraq; February 2004 – April 2004, senior air liaison officer to Multi-National Division-North, Iraq), as a lieutenant colonel
- July 2005 – May 2007, senior jump air liaison officer to 18th Airborne Corps, Fort Bragg, N.C. (August 2005 – February 2006, senior air liaison officer to Multi-National Corps-Iraq), as a colonel
- July 2010 – July 2012, director for strategy, policy and plans (J5), Headquarters U.S. Southern Command, Miami, Fla., as a brigadier general
- July 2012 – August 2013, commanding general, NATO Air Training Command Afghanistan; and commander of 438th Air Expeditionary Wing, Kabul, Afghanistan, as a brigadier general
- June 2014 – October 2016, vice director for strategic plans and policy (J5), Joint Staff, the Pentagon, Washington, D.C., as a major general
- November 2016 – present: deputy chairman of North Atlantic Treaty Organization Military Committee, Brussels, Belgium, as a lieutenant general

== Flight Information ==
Rating: command pilot

Flight hours: more than 3,000, including 600 combat hours

Aircraft flown: F-16, A-10, H-1, C-27

== Awards and decorations ==
Personal decorations
	Defense Superior Service Medal
Width-44 crimson ribbon with a pair of width-2 white stripes on the edges	Legion of Merit with one bronze oak leaf cluster
	Bronze Star Medal with four bronze oak leaf clusters
	Meritorious Service Medal with one bronze oak leaf cluster
	Air Medal with six oak leaf clusters
	Aerial Achievement Medal with two bronze oak leaf clusters
	Air Force Commendation Medal with bronze oak leaf cluster
	Air Force Achievement Medal with bronze oak leaf cluster
	Air Force Combat Action Medal
Unit awards
	Air Force Meritorious Unit Award
	Air Force Outstanding Unit Award with Valor device
	Air Force Organizational Excellence Award
	Combat Readiness Medal
Campaign and service medals
	National Defense Service Medal with bronze service star
	Southwest Asia Service Medal
	Afghanistan Campaign Medal
	Iraq Campaign Medal with three service stars
	Global War on Terrorism Expeditionary Medal
	Global War on Terrorism Service Medal
	Armed Forces Service Medal
	Humanitarian Service Medal
Service, training, and marksmanship awards
	Air Force Overseas Long Tour Service Ribbon with two bronze oak leaf clusters
	Air Force Expeditionary Service Ribbon with gold frame
	Air Force Expeditionary Service Ribbon
	Air Force Longevity Service Award with silver and three bronze oak leaf clusters
	Small Arms Expert Marksmanship Ribbon with bronze service star
	Air Force Training Ribbon
Foreign awards
	National Order of Merit (France), in the Rank of Knight
	NATO Chairman Commemorative Medal (Czech Republic)
	NATO Medal (Non-Article 5)
	Kuwait Liberation Medal (Kuwait)

Other accoutrements
	US Air Force Command Pilot Badge
	Basic Parachutist Badge
	Office of the Joint Chiefs of Staff Identification Badge
	Headquarters Air Force Badge
Other awards
Honorable Order of Saint Barbara (U.S. Army / U.S. Marine Corps Artillery)	Order of the Daedalians' Orville Wright Achievement Award
Undergraduate Pilot Training (Helicopter) Top Graduate	Undergraduate Pilot Training (Fixed Wing Conversion) Top Graduate
Lead-in Fighter Training Top Gun	A-10 Replacement Training Top Gun

== Effective dates of promotion ==
Promotions
Insignia	Rank	Date
	Lieutenant general	3 November 2016
	Major general	3 December 2013
	Brigadier general	2 August 2010
	Colonel	1 July 2005
	Lieutenant colonel	1 April 2000
	Major	1 December 1995
	Captain	30 May 1988
	First lieutenant	30 May 1986
	Second lieutenant	30 May 1984

Military offices
Preceded by Timothy Ray	Commander of the 438th Air Expeditionary Wing; 2012–2013	Succeeded by John E. Michel
Preceded by Anthony J. Rock	Vice Director for Strategy, Plans, and Policy of the Joint Staff; 2014–2016	Succeeded by Richard D. Clarke
Preceded by Mark O. Schissler	Deputy Chair of the NATO Military Committee; 2016–2019	Succeeded by Scott Kindsvater
