= Helene Billing Wurlitzer =

American philanthropist (1874–1963)

Helene Valeska Billing Wurlitzer
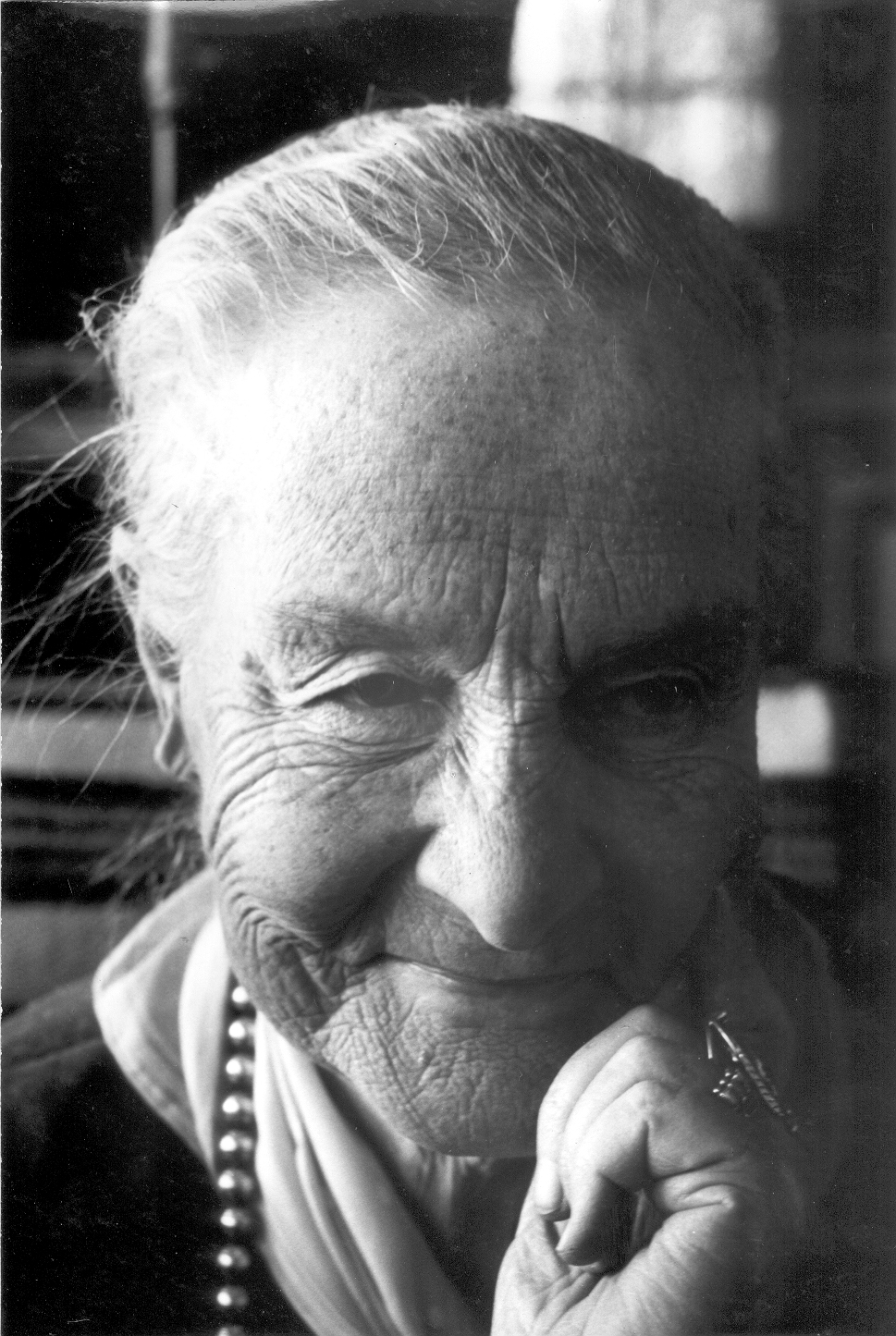
- Helene Wurlitzer age 87, 1961, photo by Kazik Pazovski in Taos
- Born: December 15, 1874; Salt Lake City, Utah
- Died: December 23, 1963 (aged 89); Taos, New Mexico
- Occupations: Art patron; philanthropist
- Spouse: Howard Eugene Wurlitzer (m. 1895–1928)
- Children: 3 (Raimund, Louise, Valeska)

Helene Valeska Billing Wurlitzer (1874–1963) was notable for her philanthropy in the arts in both Ohio and New Mexico. Helene was born in Salt Lake City to German immigrant Gustav Billing (1840–1890) and Henriette Schneider Billing (1849–1939), a Cincinnati physician's daughter. Helene's parents were in Utah establishing a mining smelter funded by Ohio investors. She was the first of two children; her sister being born in 1888.

== Early life ==
In 1878, the Billing family moved to Colorado to oversee the operation of a silver and lead smelter in Leadville. In 1880, Billing purchased another mining operation, the Kelly Mine, in Magdalena, New Mexico just west of Socorro and moved his family to that city. Helene thrived in the New Mexico desert. The Billing family moved to Cincinnati in 1887, Henriette’s childhood home but then soon moved to Freiburg, Germany so that the children could have a better education. Gustav died unexpectedly and within a few years Henriette moved the family back to Cincinnati and ran the family mining business herself.

== Marriage ==
During her years in Cincinnati, Helene met Howard Wurlitzer (1871–1928), whose family manufactured musical instruments. Helene and Howard married in a large German wedding on November 5, 1895 in Cincinnati. While Howard ran the Wurlitzer music business, Helene studied and pursued artistic endeavors, with much of her energy spent on the University of Cincinnati – College Conservatory of Music. The couple had three children: Raimund, Louise and Valeska. Howard died at age 57, in 1928, and his brothers took over the business, by that time famous for its pianos, organs and jukeboxes.

== Philanthropy ==
Helene began her philanthropic work in Cincinnati, Ohio in the first decade of the twentieth century. Following her mother’s example, she was a member of the Germanistic Society, a supporter of the German Theater, and was a sponsor of the contemporary music series at the Cincinnati Woman’s club. After WWI, she was a prominent participant in the Carnegie Institute of International Education, a student exchange program designed to further the cause of international understanding between American and German students. She often hosted European students who were attending the Music Conservatory at Cincinnati College, and was actively involved with the Cincinnati College and instrumental in seeing the institution operate and maintain high academic standards. Helene helped establish a clinic to research the relationship between unrelated diseases and focal infections and contributed to cancer and epilepsy research.

Helene’s philanthropy in Cincinnati operated through Helen Wurlitzer Foundation. She dissolved this entity in the early 1950s when she established the Taos foundation, named The Helene Wurlitzer Foundation of New Mexico. This foundation grants financial support to visual, literary and musical artists, has an artist residency program, and provides scholarships to high school students seeking college education in the arts.

The Harwood Museum of Art described Helene’s focus on the arts in a 2018 exhibition catalogue: “The women of her family engaged in philanthropic pursuits, and Wurlitzer continued the tradition. A strong supporter of the Cincinnati College Conservatory of Music, Wurlitzer was the first woman to serve as a member of its Board of Regents. In 1955, the Conservatory acknowledged Wurlitzer’s contributions with an honorary doctorate degree. In 1956, the Helene Wurlitzer Foundation of New Mexico was incorporated.” During her time at the Conservatory, Helene met Eduardo Rael, a young vocal scholarship student from Taos. She offered to pay his tuition in exchange for Spanish lessons, beginning a lifetime friendship.

== Taos years ==
Helene returned to New Mexico in 1940 after the deaths of her mother and daughter, Valeska. At Eduardo’s urging she visited Taos for the first time where she purchased 14 acres of land near Taos Plaza and soon an adobe home, built by Arturo V. Martinez y Salazar, was completed. She spent summers in Taos and winters in Cincinnati for about 14 years then moved full time to Taos. Throughout the 40s and 50s, Helene supported and patronized artists including Ansel Adams, Earl Stroh, Andrew Dasburg, Patrociño Barela, Tom Benrimo, Ira Moskowitz, Emil Bisttram, Agnes Martin and Dorothy Brett.

In about 1950, Helene met a young academic, Henry Sauerwein III, employed for ten years by the Pentagon in Maryland. He and his colleague Burton Phillips had recently left their government employment and moved to Taos. Helene and Henry became close friends with a common interest in art, languages and music. In 1954, with Henry’s help, Helene established the Helene Wurlitzer Foundation of New Mexico with a mission to provide residencies and stipends for artists, writers and musicians. The first artist to receive a stipend grant was Agnes Martin. The board of directors included community members from all three local cultures, Taos Pueblo, Hispanic and Anglo. Helene died in Taos in 1963 at age 89.

== The Wurlitzer Foundation ==
The Helene Wurlitzer Foundation of New Mexico continues as one of the oldest artist residency programs in the USA. Thirty-three artists––visual, literary and musical––are accommodated in adobe casitas for three-month residencies each year. To date, over 1200 artists have benefited from time to meditate, create, experiment in Taos, New Mexico. On the occasion of an exhibition titled “Wurlitzer Alumni,” (2018) the Harwood Museum states, “These artists have come to Taos from all over the United States and the world to immerse themselves in a creative sanctuary. When they return to their homes, they bring back the inspiration of the Taos land and people. These artists also shape the Taos community. Each generation, some of the artists fall in love with Taos and make it their home. This is the quiet, enduring legacy of Helene Wurlitzer.”

For the most part, the foundation has sponsored artists with traditional residency grants, along the lines of Yaddo and McDowell colonies but it has also assisted artists in need – Andrew Dasburg when he was ill and Agnes Martin for art supplies when she was preparing for a major exhibition. In more recent years, the foundation has added four-year scholarships to Taos high school students pursuing education in visual, literary or musical arts to its efforts to "support the artist and the creative process."
