= Admiral Ray =

Admiral Ray may refer to:

- Charles Ray (admiral) (fl. 1980s–2020s), U.S. Coast Guard admiral
- Herbert J. Ray (1893–1970), U.S. Navy rear admiral
- Norman W. Ray (born 1942), U.S. Navy vice admiral
