= Percy Tsisete Sandy =

American (Zuni) artist

- Kai-Sa (Red Moon)
- Born: November 11, 1918; Zuni Pueblo, New Mexico
- Died: May 1974 (aged 55); Taos, New Mexico
- Known for: gouache watercolor painting
- Spouse: Peggy Mirabel

Percy Tsisete Sandy (1918–1974) was a Zuni artist. His native name was Kai-Sa (Red Moon); he is also known as Percy Sandy Tsisete. His paintings were signed with the name Kai-Sa.

== Education ==
Kai-Sa was born on the Zuni Pueblo in Northern New Mexico. He began painting in his youth while attending Zuni Day School. Later he enrolled in art programs in Albuquerque, and at the Sherman Institute in Riverside, California, and the Santa Fe Indian School in Santa Fe.

== Biography ==
Kai-Sa married Peggy Mirabel. The two moved to Taos as Mirabel was from Taos Pueblo. They had three sons and a daughter.

After moving to Taos, Kai-Sa met Helene Wurlitzer, a philanthropist who supported the work of numerous artists in New Mexico. After having his family over for dinner, she made a commitment to fund his art practice by establishing a credit account for him at a local art supply store. In 1955 he received a fellowship grant from Wurlitzer's foundation.

The primary subject matter of his paintings were ceremonial rituals within Native communities, including Zuni, Taos, Apache and Navajo cultures. He is known for his watercolor and gouache paintings of Kachina entities and dancers, and for his murals at the La Fonda Hotel in Taos, New Mexico, and at the Black Rock School and Black Rock Hospital in New Mexico.

Kai-Sa described his intentions as an artist in 1940, "As an Indian artist, I hope to be instrumental in artistically and authentically depicting the customs of my people." His works revealing ceremonial rituals of the Zuni (of which he was a tribal member), caused friction among members of the pueblo.

Kai-Sa was seriously injured in an accident in 1959, which periodically impaired his ability to paint, although he continued to exhibit his work.

== Collections ==
Their work is held in the permanent collections of the Delaware Art Museum, the Gilcrease Museum, the Smithsonian Museum the Minneapolis Institute of Art. Other collections include the Heard Museum, the Museum of New Mexico, the Philbrook Art Center in Tulsa, Oklahoma, and the Indian Arts and Crafts Board the United Pueblo Agency of New Mexico, and the Museum of Northern Arizona.
