= Jean Ray =

Jean Ray may refer to:

- Jean Ray (author) (1887–1964), pseudonym of a Belgian writer
- Jean Ray of Jim and Jean, an early-mid-1960s folk music duo
- Jean Ray Laury (born Jean Ray; 1929–2011), American quiltmaker

== See also ==
- Jean Rey (disambiguation)
- Dorothy Jean Ray (1919–2007), historian of folk art
