= Malcolm I. Fages =

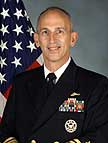
- Born: 5 December 1946 (age 79)
- Military career
- Allegiance: United States
- Branch: United States Navy
- Service years: 1968–2004
- Rank: Vice Admiral

Malcolm Irving Fages (born 5 December 1946) is a retired vice admiral in the United States Navy who served Deputy Chairman of the NATO Military Committee from 2001 to 2004.

A native of Jacksonville, Florida, Fages earned bachelor's degree in mechanical engineering from Auburn University. He later received a M.A. degree in political science from the University of Central Florida in 1990.

After serving on several submarines, Fages was given command of the nuclear submarine Narwhal (SSN-671) and the gold crew of the ballistic missile submarine Pennsylvania (SSBN-735). He later served as commanding officer of Submarine Group Two.
