= Mary Crow =

American poet, translator, and professor

Mary Crow is an American poet, translator, and professor who served as the poet laureate of Colorado for 14 years. She is the author of three collections of poetry, three chapbooks and five translations.

She has been awarded many honors and prizes including poetry fellowships from the National Endowment for the Arts and the Colorado Council on the Arts, a Creative Writing Award from the Fulbright Commission to read her poems in Yugoslavia, a Colorado Book Award, a Translation Award from Columbia University's Translation Center, Fulbright research awards to Chile, Peru, Argentina, and Venezuela. She has been awarded writers' residencies in the Czech Republic by Milkwood International, in Spain by Fundacion Valparaiso, in Israel by Miskenot Sha'ananim, in France by Camac, and in Egypt by El Gouna as well as at MacDowell, Hedgebrook, Ragdale, Djerassi, the Helene Wurlitzer Foundation, and the Lannan Foundation

Crow has published her work widely in magazines and journals, including American Poetry Review, Hotel Amerika, Cimarron Review, FIELD, Michigan Quarterly Review, Prairie Schooner, Smartish Pace, and Ploughshares. Garrison Keillor read her poem, "Saturday Matinee," on the NPR program The Writer's Almanac.

Raised in Loudonville, Ohio, and educated at the College of Wooster, Indiana University Bloomington, and the Iowa Writers Workshop, she is now Emeritus Professor of English at Colorado State University.

== Published works ==
Full-length Poetry Collections

- I Have Tasted the Apple (BOA Editions, 1996)
- Borders (BOA Editions, 1989)
- Addicted to the Horizon (CW Books, 2012)

Chapbooks

- The High Cost of Living (Pudding House, 2002)
- The Business of Literature (Four Zoas, 1981)
- Going Home (Lynx House, 1979)

Translations

- "Vertical Poetry: Last Poems by Roberto Juarroz" (2011)
- Engravings Torn From Insomnia: Poems by Olga Orozco (2002)
- Vertical Poetry: Recent Poems: Recent Poems by Roberto Juarroz (1992)
- From the Country of Nevermore: Selected Poems by Jorge Teillier (1990)
- Woman Who Has Sprouted Wings: Poems by Contemporary Latin American Women Poets (1987)

== Sources ==
- Author Website
- BOA Editions > Mary Crow > Author Page
- PEN American Center > Translator Profile > Mary Crow
