= Verne F. Ray =

Verne Frederick Ray, (1905 – September 28, 2003) was anthropology professor at the University of Washington, with a B.A. and M.A. in anthropology from Washington and a Ph.D. (in 1937) from Yale. Ray was one of the first anthropologists at UW, was head of the Department of Anthropology and associate dean of the graduate school.

He is known best for assisting Northwest tribes with tribal land-claim settlements and is viewed as pioneer in the field of ethnohistory. The Cowlitz tribe, which he helped gain federal recognition, made him an honorary member in 2000. Some of his papers are held at Gonzaga University.

He was married to fellow anthropologist and author Dorothy Jean Ray.

== Bibliography ==
He is the author or editor of 52 books dealing with the anthropology of the American Indians of the Northwest. In particular, his work with the Interior Salish Tribes of Washington following the passage of the Indian Claims Commission Act in 1946 led to the publication of a number of important articles on the tribes, including the following:

- Ray, Verne F. "The Columbia Confederacy: A League of Central Plateau Tribes." In Stanley Diamond, editor, Culture in History: Essays in Honor of Paul Radin. Columbia University Press: New York, 1960, pp. 771–789.
- Ray, Verne F. "Cultural Relations in the Plateau of Northwestern America." Publications of the Frederick Webb Hodge Anniversary Publication Fund, Vol. III. Los Angeles, 1939.
- Ray, Verne F. "Ethnohistorical Notes on the Columbia, Chelan, Entiat, and Wenatchee Tribes," Interior Salish and Eastern Washington Indians IV. Garland Publishing Inc.: New York, 1974.
- Ray, Verne F. "Native Village and Groupings of the Columbia Basin," Pacific Northwest Quarterly. Vol. 27 No. 2, April, 1936.
- Ray, Verne F., The Sanpoil and Nespelem: Salishan Peoples of Northeastern Washington (New Haven, Human Relations Area Files, 1954) [Originally published as Vol. V, University of Washington Publications in Anthropology, 1933].
