= Jean Rey =

Jean Rey may refer to:

- Jean Rey (physician) (c. 1583–c. 1645), French physician and chemist
- Jean Rey (politician) (1902–1983), Belgian Liberal politician
- Jean Rey (cyclist) (1925–1950), French cyclist

== See also ==
- Jean Ray (disambiguation)
