= United Midget Racing Association =

Midget car open wheel racing group

United Midget Racing Association is a midget car open wheel racing group established in 1961. The racing association schedules TQ Midget races for May to October.

== Description ==
UMRA is often used by young go kart racers to gain open wheel experience before progressing to professional formats. But many UMRA racers are long time participants.

== Famous drivers ==
UMRA was the start of open wheel racing for NASCAR Driver Tony Stewart.

Former UMRA turned pro drivers return to UMRA races for the fun of racing. One such example was in 2000, when Tony Stewart returned to UMRA for a quick race before a Winston Cup test. This was the first time he had raced against his father, Nelson Stewart.

As of 2008 the following eight drivers had United States Auto Club (USAC) and UMRA titles.

=== Tony Stewart ===
- 1994 & 1995 USAC National Midget Champion
- 1995 USAC National Sprint Champion
- 1995 USAC Silver Crown Champion

UMRA feature wins (11)

- 7/14/89 Rush Co. Fairgrounds, Rushville, IN
- 7/18/89 Jefferson Co. Fairgrounds, Madison, IN
- 9/3/89 Decatur Co. Fairgrounds, Greensburg, IN
- 9/4/89 Decatur Co. Fairgrounds, Greensburg, IN
- 7/14/90 Rush Co. Fairgrounds, Rushville, IN
- 7/17/90 Jefferson Co. Fairgrounds, Madison, IN
- 8/31/90 Bartholomew Co. Fairgrounds, Columbus, IN
- 6/29/91 New Paris Speedway, New Paris, IN
- 7/17/91 Decatur Co. Fairgrounds, Greensburg, IN
- 7/23/93 Rush Co. Fairgrounds, Rushville, IN
- 7/4/96 Rush Co. Fairgrounds, Rushville, IN

==== Terry Goff ====
- 15 UMRA CHAMPIONSHIPS - 1988, 92,94,95,97,98,99,00,01,03,04,07,08,09,10
- 1980 UMRA Rookie of the Year
- 1984 SMRA Runner Up
- 1987 Florida Fall Shoot-Out Champion
- 1988, 92,01,03,05,06,08,09,10,11 UMRA Asphalt Champion
- 1990 USAC Speedrome Midget Rookie of the Year
- 1992 Milwaukee Winter Classic Midget Champion
- 1992, 95, 97 UMRA Mechanic of the Year
- 1993 Florida Winter National Champion
- 1994 Fair Week Champion
- 1995, 05 UMRA Rushville Regional Series Champion
- 2001 UMRA President
- 2003, 04 Rumble in Ft. Wayne Winner
- 2004 RCA Rumble in the Dome Winner

UMRA Feature Wins (120)

- Florida Feature Wins (15)
- USAC Speedrome Feature Wins (10)
- SMRA Feature Wins (2)
- UMRA 1st in All time Point Standings
- UMRA 1st in All Time Point Championships

=== Tate Martz ===
- 2004 & 2005 USAC Midwest Ford Focus Champion
- 2006 USAC Midwest Pavement Ford Focus Champion

UMRA feature wins (6)

- 8/31/06 Ripley Co. Fairgrounds, Osgood, IN
- 7/13/07 Bloomington Speedway, Bloomington, IN
- 7/20/07 Gas City I-69 Speedway, Gas City, IN
- 8/17/07 Vermillion Co. Speedway, Danville, IL
- 8/25/07 Mount Lawn Speedway, New Castle, IN
- 9/22/07 Mount Lawn Speedway, New Castle, IN

=== Mike Streicher ===
- 1991 USAC National Midget Champion

UMRA feature wins (2)

- 11/28/85 Salem Civic Center, Salem, VA
- 11/29/85 Salem Civic Center, Salem, VA

=== Duane "Pancho" Carter, Jr. ===
- 1972 USAC National Midget Champion
- 1974 & 1976 USAC National Sprint Champion
- 1978 USAC Champ Dirt Car Champion

UMRA feature wins (1)

- 7/21/70 Salem, IN (not Salem Speedway)

=== Robby Flock ===
- 1986, 1989, 1992 & 2002 USAC Western Midget Champion

UMRA feature wins (1)

- 7/24/81 Rush Co. Fairgrounds, Rushville, IN

=== Bobby Michnowicz ===
- 2006 USAC California Dirt Ford Focus Champion

UMRA feature wins (1)

- 7/20/82 Jefferson Co. Fairgrounds, Madison, IN

=== Gary Howard ===
- 1989 USAC TQ Midget Champion

UMRA feature wins (1)

- 7/12/89 Vermilion Co. Raceway, Danville, IL

=== Robbie Ray ===
- 2003 USAC Indiana Ford Focus Champion
- 2005 USAC National Ford Focus Champion

UMRA feature wins (1)

- 6/30/01 Rush Co. Fairgrounds, Rushville, IN
