= Robert Ray (artist) =

American artist

Robert Donald Ray
- Born: October 24, 1924; Denver, Colorado
- Died: March 29, 2002 (aged 77); Taos, New Mexico
- Education: University of Southern California
- Known for: Painting, printmaking, sculpture
- Style: Abstract
- Movement: Modernism

Robert Donald Ray (October 24, 1924 – March 29, 2002) was an American artist, active in the middle to late twentieth century.

He also had an art collection which included works by Pablo Picasso, Andy Warhol, John French Sloan, Childe Hassam, Käthe Kollwitz, select works from the Taos Moderns and the Taos Society of Artists.

== Early life, travel and education ==
Robert Ray was born in Denver, Colorado in 1924; one of two sons raised by Irene and Carl J. Ray, Sr. Ray graduated from Denver East High School and enrolled at Drake University. His studies were interrupted by World War II, during which he enlisted in the Navy, serving in South Pacific and Japan. After the war, he completed his studies in visual art at the University of Southern California in Los Angeles, graduating cum laude with a Bachelor of Fine Arts in 1950. He then received a MFA degree from the Centro de Estudios Universitarios in 1952. Following graduation, and travel to Europe, Ray moved to Taos in 1954.

== Work ==
Over the course of his career, Ray worked in a wide variety of media. In 1968, Ray's work was described by Robert A. Ewing, former curator of Fine Arts Museum of Santa Fe, New Mexico in the following words: "There is in his work the magic of a court jeweler working with materials of our time. Whether it be the masterfully controlled intricacy of drawing or the compelling power of sculpture in which one discovers surprises from the natural world in combination with elements as unexpected as shattered glass, there is a delight and timelessness in the Southwestern Odyssey of Robert Ray."

As stated by Phaedra Greenwood in a review of a retrospective show near the conclusion of Ray's life: "Rarely has a one-person show displayed such a range in wood, metal, glass and oil on linen, timeless abstracts polished to a gem like finish. He's a minimalist of the highest order; nothing is wasted or overdone. Each piece is a classic statement of elegance, tension and pure essence."

Ray's early work consisted of graphite, ink, wood-cut prints and oil, and ranged from portraits to abstract prints to still-life and semi-representational landscapes. Shortly after arriving to Taos in 1954, Eulalia Emetaz invited Ray to show in her Galeria Escondida (The Hidden Gallery) in Taos, which led to a two-year residency grant from the Wurlitzer Foundation, 1954–1956." During this time, Ray painted numerous portraits including The Honorable Dorothy Brett which helped Ray to establish a local following. "[A]fter I did Dorothy Brett's portrait, others wanted one, I'm sorry that Frieda Lawrence died just before I was going to paint her. And Georgia (O'Keefe) couldn't sit still long enough; she was better suited to photography".

Writing in Prize Winning Oil Paintings and Why they Won the Prize, author Margaret Harold quotes David Gebhard, director of the Roswell Museum and Art Center:

Ray represents an interesting case in current American painting, in that he generally retains reference to subject matter, although he is by no means a representational painter... [H]is major asset is in his tactile quality, and the subtle aspect of his color. These two aspects are combined to produce a really 'Classic' quality in all of his painting which I have experienced.

Ray earned his first award in "The Midwest Third Biennial Exhibition" held at the Joslyn Art Museum, 1954. This showing was followed by awards in Brooklyn, New York; Dallas, Texas; Columbia, South Carolina; and the Museum of New Mexico. In 1959, Ray was selected in "Painting - New Talent in the U.S.A." by the magazine Art in America. Ray also maintains the distinction of being the only artist to exhibit in each of the "Taos Moderns" annual exhibitions held. In 1961, Ray was described locally as "one of the outstanding young artists in America today," and in 1964, Ray exhibited artwork in the Southwestern America presentation at the World's Fair in New York. Ray won further recognition in 1969 for sculpture (Wood & Glass), and 1972 in graphics.

In 1961, Ray stated his view on art sales:

the best method [to determine art pricing] is through auction, except for a living artist's works; the contemporaries must sell through supply and demand.

Having established a strong reputation in the 1950s and 1960s, Ray shifted focus to his role as an artisan and citizen of Taos, serving on "just about every art related board in Taos that ever existed." As summarized by Robert Ellis, Harwood Museum Director, in a 2000 retrospective:

Robert Ray, since arriving in Taos in 1954, has played a vital role both as an artist and as a resident. Over the years the Taos community and the Harwood have benefitted from Bob's many years of service on the non-profit boards that include the Little Theater Board (he also designed stage sets), The Taos Art Association, Taos Public Library, and the Taos School of Music (currently).

Following retrospective shows in 1999 and 2000, Ray resumed a prolific pace of painting, creating numerous series of representational and abstract watercolors prior to his death in 2002.

== Exhibitions ==
Noteworthy Exhibit

Ray's work was included in an exhibition along with Pablo Picasso, Andy Warhol, many of the Taos Moderns and other notable Taos artists in a show produced in part, by Dennis Hopper. The show was titled "Taos collects the Modern since 1900".

Art and Atom - Traveling Exhibition

Eight of the Taos Moderns created works selected by the Los Alamos Scientific Laboratory (LASL) for use in a traveling exhibition that accompanied a graduate recruiting campaign in the early 1960s. The approach was unique: "LASL is a pioneer in the use of contemporary art in recruiting ads and is perhaps the first to use finished line art for that purpose." The art from the show was used in the LASL recruiting booth at the National Science Convention, included in the LASL publication "A-R-T Spells Science" and selected on basis that the art "fit an idea LASL wanted to express."

Career Exhibitions

- Denver Art Museum (Included in 16 exhibitions 1953–2002)
- Colorado Springs Fine Arts Center (Included in 11 exhibitions 1955–2002, One-man show: 1968)
- Library of Congress, Washington, DC: 13th National Exhibition of Prints, 1955
- New Mexico Museum of Art, Santa Fe, New Mexico: Included in 27 exhibitions 1956–2002. One-man shows: 1959, 1967
- Roswell Museum and Art Center, New Mexico 1956, 1957, 1958, 1959, 1960, 1962, 1964
- The American Federation of Arts, New York City: New Talent, U.S.A. 1956
- Nelson Gallery-Atkins Museum, Kansas City, Missouri, Mid-America Annuals: 1957, 1958, 1959
- University of Illinois, Urbana, Contemporary American Paintings and Sculpture: 1957, 1959
- Chrysler Art Museum, Provincetown, Massachusetts: 1st Provincetown Arts Festival, 1958
- San Diego Museum of Fine Arts, California. Taos Now, 1960
- Palace of the Legion of Honor, San Francisco, California: Art and the Atom, 1965

== Collections ==
=== Private collections ===
Ray's work was part of a notable collection of artwork held by Edwin Bewley of Taos. The collection included works by Pablo Picasso, Andy Warhol, John French Sloan, Childe Hassam, Käthe Kollwitz, select works from the Taos Moderns and the Taos Society of Artists.

The Helene Wurlitzer Foundation collection of artwork in her home consisted of works by Andrew Dasburg, Emil Bisttram, Robert D. Ray, Tom Benrimo, Clay Spohn, Earl Stroh, Ernest Blumenshein, O.E. Berninghaus and Leon Gaspard

Other collections include:

- First National Bank of Dallas – Now part of US Bancorp
- First National Bank of Arizona

=== Public collections ===
- Denver Art Museum, Colorado
- Sheldon Museum, University of Nebraska, Lincoln
- Utah State University, Logan, UT
- Baltimore Museum of Art, Maryland
- Joslyn Art Museum, Omaha, Nebraska
- Roswell Museum and Art Center, New Mexico
- Columbia Museum of Art, South Carolina
- New Mexico Museum of Art, Santa Fe, New Mexico
- The Old Jail Foundation and Art Center, Albany, Texas
- Colorado Springs Fine Arts Center, Colorado
- Ball State Teachers College, Muncie, Indiana
- Brooklyn Museum of Art, New York
- Harwood Museum - University of New Mexico

== Art market ==
From 1954 to 1958, Ray was affiliated with La Galeria Escondida (Taos, NM). Between 1958 and 1964, Ray was affiliated locally and nationally with the Charles Feingarten Gallery (Chicago, IL), the Esther Robles Gallery (Los Angeles, CA), Bolles Gallery (San Francisco, CA), Fifth Avenue Gallery (Ft. Worth, TX), The Bon Marche National Gallery (Seattle, WA). From 1964 until 2002, Ray affiliated nearly exclusively with local galleries; Mission Gallery (1964-1992), Bareiss Gallery (1999), New Directions Gallery (2000-2002). Ray also enjoyed long associations with Taos Artist Association sponsored Stables Gallery (1959-1989), Leone Kahl and The Harwood Foundation.
