= Helene Wurlitzer Foundation =

Artist residency program in Taos, New Mexico

The Helene Wurlitzer Foundation of New Mexico
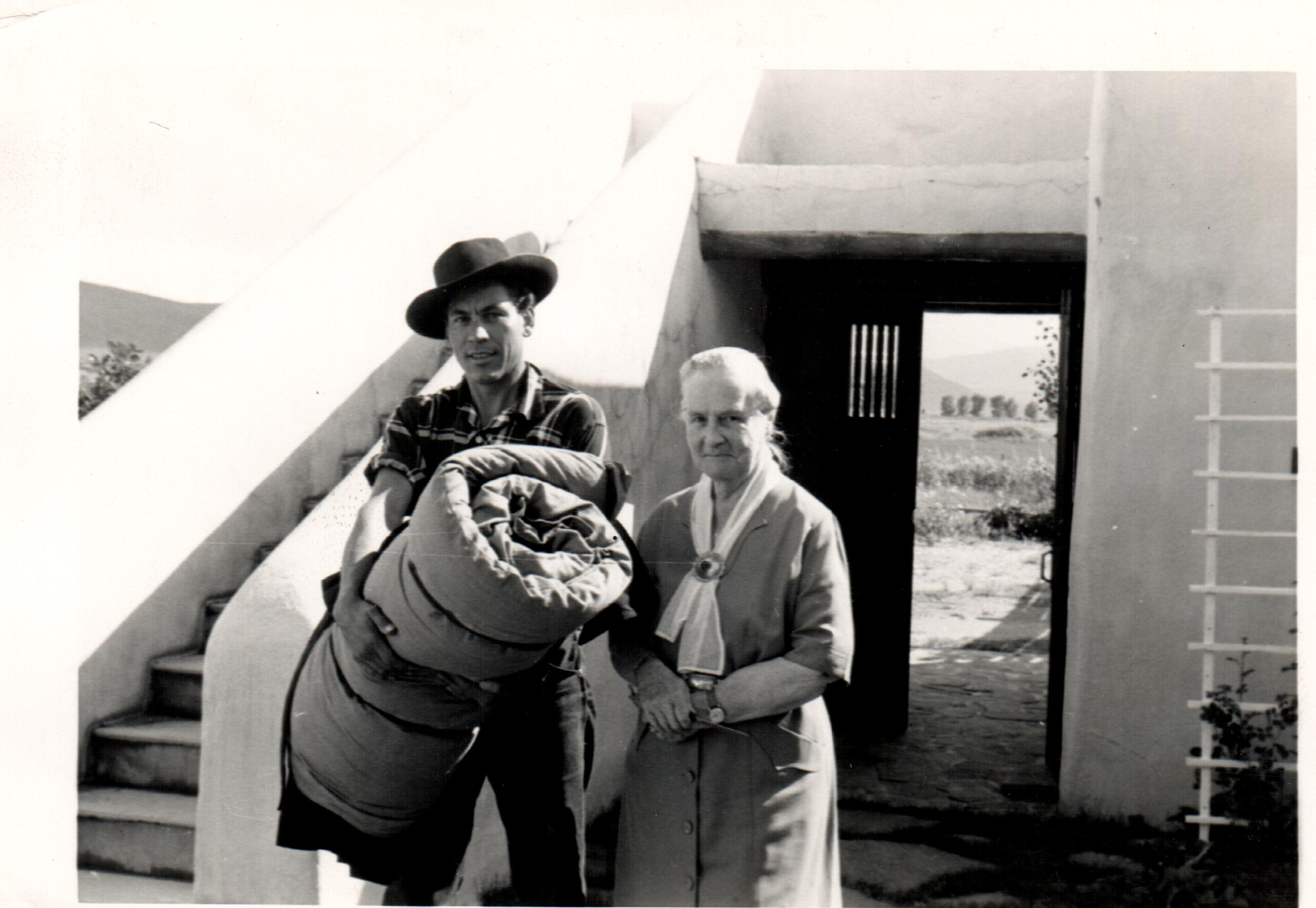
- Helene Wurlitzer in Taos with Eduardo Rael, 1950s
- Formation: 1954; incorporated 1956
- Type: Artist residency
- Legal status: 501(c)(3)
- Purpose: To support the artist and the creative process.
- Headquarters: 218 Los Pandos Road Taos, New Mexico
- Region served: United States; international
- Executive Director: Nic Knight
- Budget: $250,000/annual operating
- Staff: 3 to 5
- Website: wurlitzerfoundation.org

Helene Wurlitzer Foundation of New Mexico is an artist residency program in the artists' colony of Taos, New Mexico. The Foundation, which offers prize fellowships to painters, poets, sculptors, writers, playwrights, composers, photographers and filmmakers, was established in 1954 and incorporated as a private nonprofit in 1958. The Foundation was conceived, funded, and organized by Helene Billing Wurlitzer (1874–1963), a philanthropist from Cincinnati who relocated to Taos in the early 1940s.

== History ==
The New Mexico iteration of Helene Wurlitzer's foundation began in Cincinnati, Ohio. Both her husband's family and her birth family had been supportive of music and visual arts organizations as well as medical research and Germanic institutions. Helene's Cincinnati philanthropy included funding the development of a radio and television department at the College of Music of Cincinnati. She also supported a musical scholarship program for the school. One of the recipients of her support was a young opera student from Taos, Eduardo Rael, who would later introduce her to his home town.

In Taos in 1954, Helene and Henry Sauerwein, a young intellectual from Baltimore who was new to Taos, conceived of moving the Ohio foundation officially to New Mexico, which was completed by 1956. The focus would be an artist residency program with occasional, as-needed scholarships for local youth and living stipends for artists in need. The structure of the foundation was as much Henry's vision as it was Helene's. Henry served as director, and Helene kept the activities funded. The board of trustees, at Helene's request, was always to include members of the Native, Hispanic, and Anglo communities.

The Helene Wurlitzer Foundation artist residency program is now the oldest such program west of the Mississippi, offering residency grants to creatives of national and international origin. Residents are selected by panels of jurors who specialize in the artistic discipline of the applicant; initial selection is based purely on the merit of their creative works.

Each year, three sessions (two at 12 weeks and one at 10 weeks) bring a total of 33 artists to the Taos campus. Artists in residence have no imposed expectations, quotas, or requirements during their stay. Helene believed in supporting artists in their process, and understood the ripple effects that unburdened time can have on a creative life.

The Foundation's mission is to support the artist and the creative process.

== The campus ==
In 1940, when Helene decided Taos would be her new home, she purchased property from Eduardo Rael's mother. The land was a short walk from Taos Plaza at the center of town and included three small adobe homes on acres of alfalfa fields. She lived in one of those casitas while her hacienda-style home was being built by local builder and craftsman, Arturo Vicente Martinez y Salazar. Over 20-plus years, Helene acquired property adjacent to her own land and designed and built three new casitas. The result was a campus with eleven residences and a commons house for visiting artists, writers, and composers, in addition to her home and guesthouse.

The original home of Helene Wurlitzer, known as the Main House, is an example of classic Taos adobe architecture and contains a large collection of early 20th century, Hispanic, and Native American art, all collected by Helene.

The 15-acre campus consists of open fields bordered by old-growth trees, connected to a centuries-old network of acequias, a traditional means of supplying water to the Taos valley. In 2018, the foundation began restoration of the acequias network. By July 2019, for the first time in several decades, the acequias irrigating the southern part of the campus flowed again.

== Leadership ==
The foundation's first director was Henry A. Sauerwein III (1918 – 1996). As a young academic who spoke many languages, Sauerwein had worked for the Pentagon throughout WWII before moving to Taos. He led the foundation from 1954 until his death in 1996, when the directorship transitioned to his assistant, Michael Knight. After 17 years, Nic Knight took up the mantle in 2015 and continues as executive director.

The foundation functions on an annual budget of approximately $250,000, with one full-time and one part-time administrative employee. The grounds and facilities are maintained by a staff of three, with additional seasonal help.

The board of directors includes seven people from the Taos community.

== Notable residents ==
Notable Grantees, 1954–2000

Ansel Adams

Agnes Martin

Andrew Dasburg

Earl Stroh

Emil Bisttram

Percy Tsisete Sandy, Kai-Sa (Red Moon)

Patrocino Barela

N. Scott Momaday

Artists who have been awarded more recent residencies at the foundation include: David Noon, Harryette Mullen, Regina Hansen Willman, Philip Gambone, Emily Warn, Robert Chesley, Paul Elwood, Mary Crow, Carol Bergé, Jon Berson, Conrad Richter, Judith Arcana, Jonathan Blum, and J. Timothy Hunt.
