= Richard D. Clarke =

US Army general

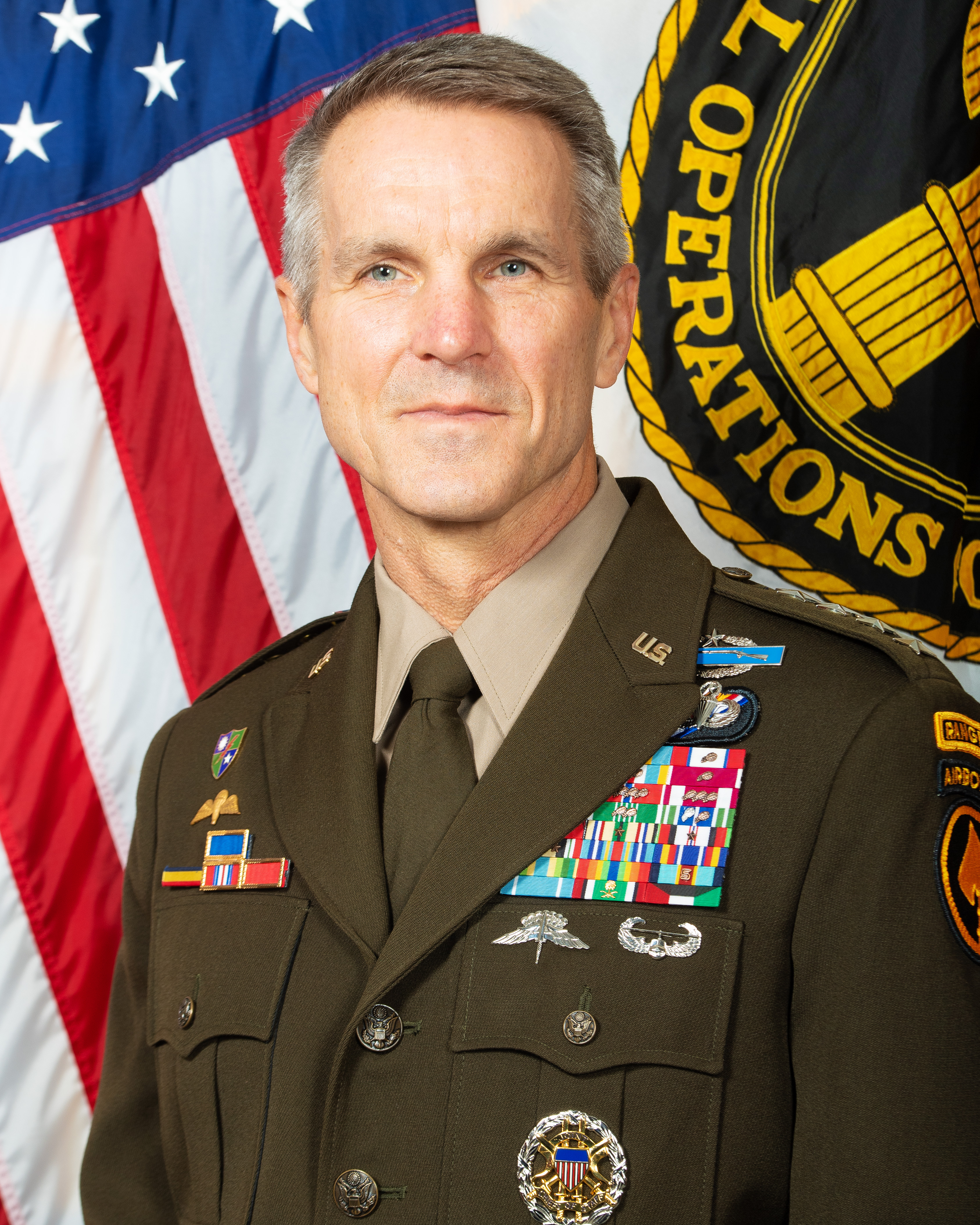
- Official portrait, 2021
- Born: 23 July 1962 (age 64); Stuttgart, West Germany
- Military career
- Allegiance: United States
- Branch: United States Army
- Service years: 1984–2022
- Rank: General
- Commands: United States Special Operations Command; 82nd Airborne Division; 75th Ranger Regiment
- Conflicts: Gulf War; War in Afghanistan; Iraq War; Operation Inherent Resolve
- Awards: Defense Distinguished Service Medal; Army Distinguished Service Medal (2); Defense Superior Service Medal (3); Legion of Merit (2); Bronze Star Medal (5)

Signature
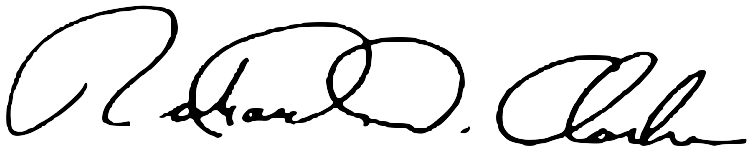

Richard D. Clarke Jr. (born 20 April 1962) is a retired United States Army four-star general who last served as the 12th commander of United States Special Operations Command from 29 March 2019 to 30 August 2022. As the USSOCOM commander, Clarke oversaw the nation's elite special operations forces and played a pivotal role in shaping U.S. military strategy in various global theaters. Prior to assuming command of USSOCOM, Clarke served as Director for Strategic Plans and Policy (J5), Joint Staff, the Pentagon, Arlington, Virginia.

Clarke's service also includes numerous deployments, including in support of Operations Desert Shield and Desert Storm, Joint Guardian, Enduring Freedom, Iraqi Freedom, and Inherent Resolve. He was recognized for his leadership in the 75th Ranger Regiment, the 82nd Airborne Division, and the 10th Mountain Division.

== Military career ==
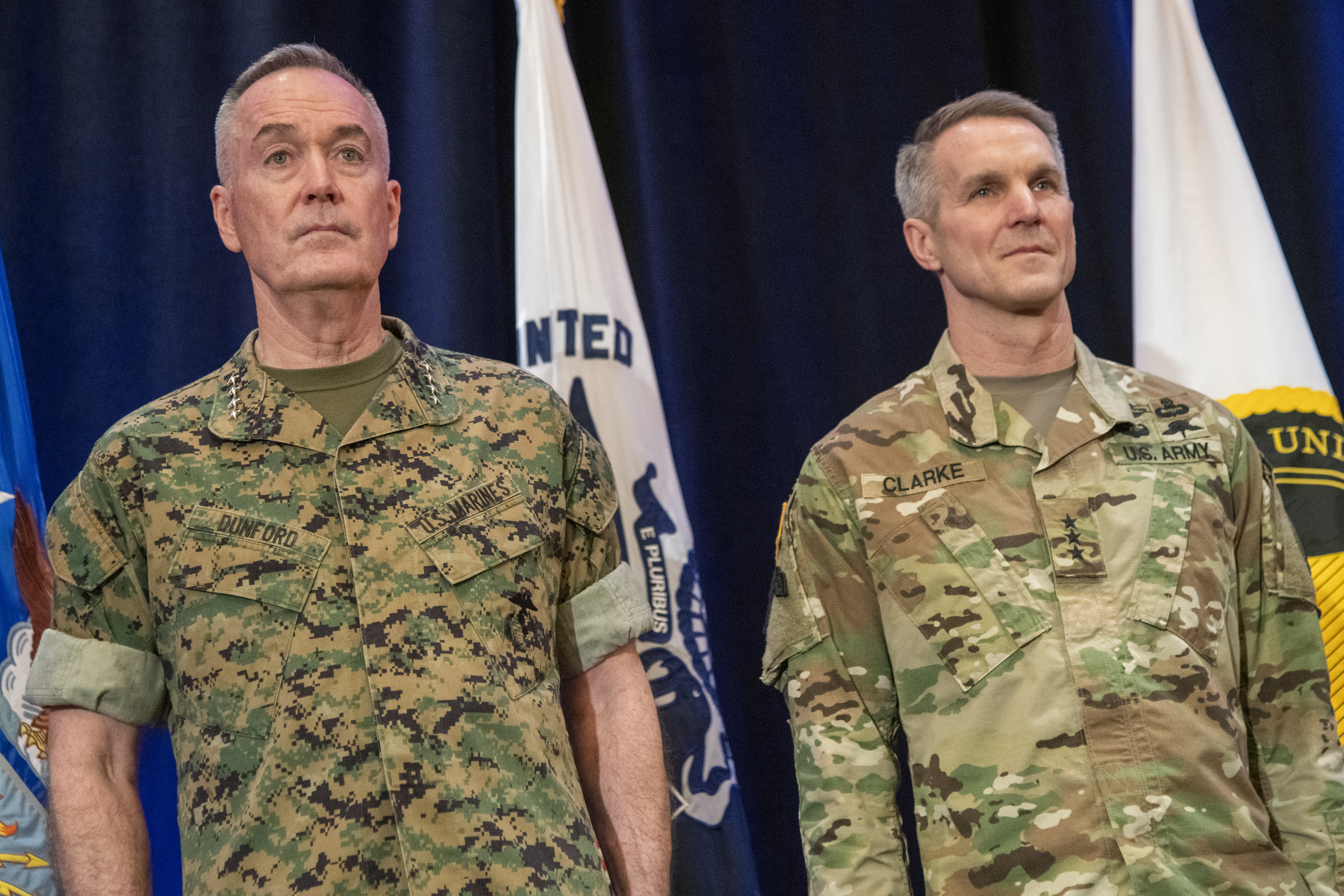
Clarke and Joseph Dunford (left), at Clarke's promotion to general on 29 March 2019.

Clarke was born in West Germany and raised in an Army family. He is a graduate of the United States Military Academy at West Point, New York, and commissioned into the Infantry Branch in 1984. He holds a Bachelor of Science degree from West Point and a Master of Business Administration from Benedictine College. He is a distinguished graduate of the National War College and earned a master's degree in Security and Strategic Studies.

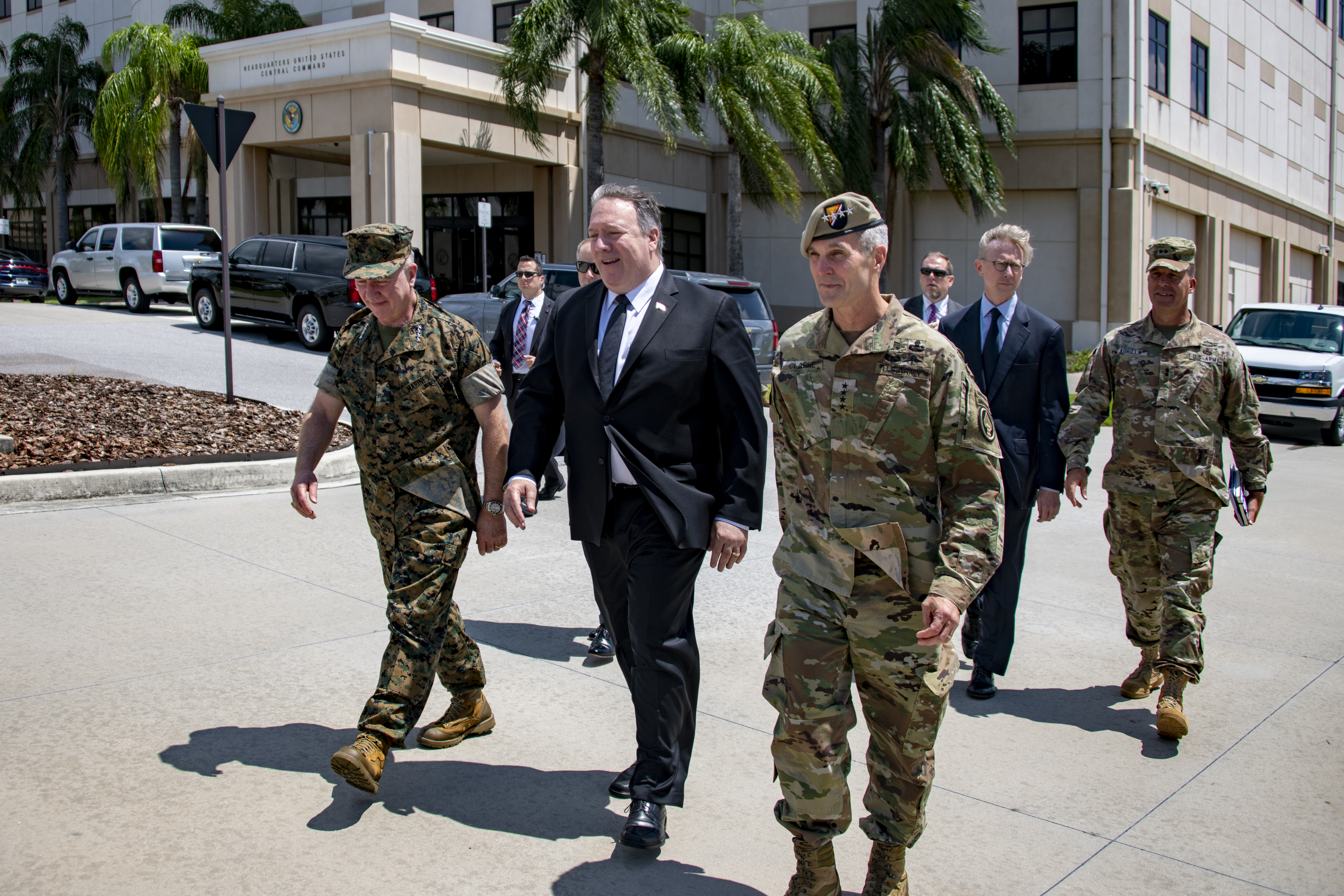
Clarke, Secretary of State Mike Pompeo (center), and CENTCOM commander Gen Frank McKenzie visit the WebOPS building at MacDill Air Force Base on 18 June 2019.

Clarke has led soldiers at all levels in Airborne, Ranger, Mechanized and Light Infantry units in five different divisions, the 173rd Airborne Brigade, and the 75th Ranger Regiment in the United States, Europe, Iraq and Afghanistan. Clarke spent eight years in the 75th Ranger Regiment as a company commander from 1994 to 1996, then as a battalion commander from 2004 to 2006 and regimental commander from 2007 to 2009. He also served as battalion commander of 3rd Battalion, 504th Parachute Infantry Regiment, 82nd Airborne Division from 2002 to 2004. His most recent assignments include serving as the Director for Strategic Plans and Policy (J5), Joint Staff, the Pentagon, Arlington, Virginia. from 2017 to 2019. General Clarke's other assignments as a general officer include: Deputy Commanding General for Operations, 10th Mountain Division from 2011 to 2013; the 74th Commandant of Cadets, United States Military Academy at West Point from 2013 to 2014; and the Commander of the 82nd Airborne Division from 2014 to 2016.

Clarke's deployments while serving in the aforementioned positions include Operations Desert Shield and Desert Storm, Operation Joint Guardian in Macedonia, three deployments in support of Operation Enduring Freedom, four deployments in support of Operation Iraqi Freedom, and one deployment as the commander of the Combined Joint Forces Land Component Command – Operation Inherent Resolve.

Clarke was appointed the 12th Commander of United States Special Operations Command (USSOCOM) on 29 March 2019.

Clarke retired from the military and relinquished his command of USSOCOM to Bryan P. Fenton on 30 August 2022. Clarke was elected to the board of defense contractor General Dynamics on 3 February 2023.

== Awards and decorations ==
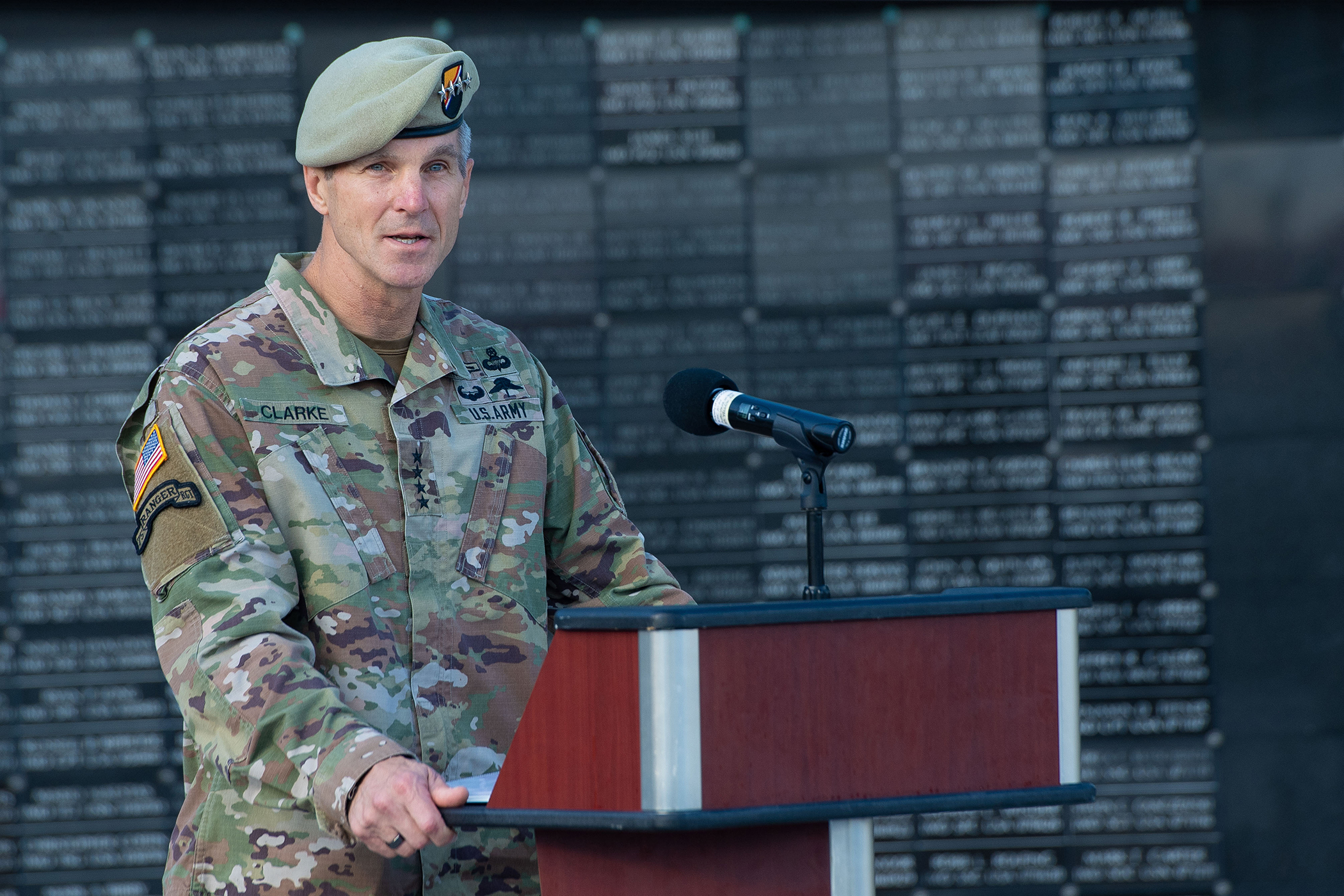
Clarke delivers remarks at the USSOCOM 9/11 remembrance ceremony on 11 September 2021.

Combat Infantryman Badge with Star (denoting 2nd award)
Expert Infantryman Badge

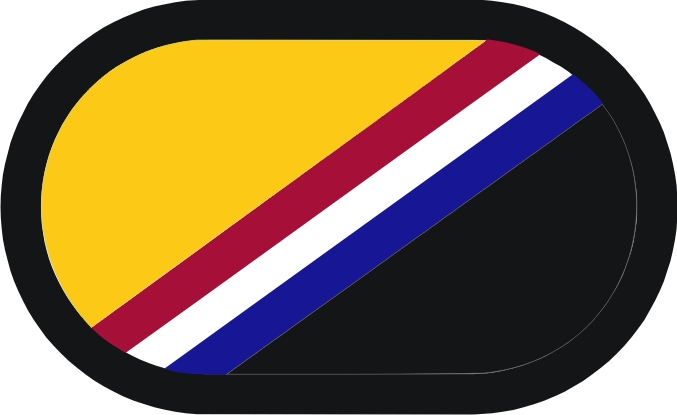
Master Parachutist Badge with United States Special Operations Command background trimming
Ranger tab
Military Free Fall Parachutist Badge
Air Assault Badge
Joint Chiefs of Staff Identification Badge
Irish Parachutist Badge in gold
75th Ranger Regiment Distinctive Unit Insignia
75th Ranger Regiment Shoulder Sleeve Insignia
9 Overseas Service Bars

Defense Distinguished Service Medal
Army Distinguished Service Medal with one bronze oak leaf cluster
Defense Superior Service Medal with two oak leaf clusters
Legion of Merit with oak leaf cluster
Bronze Star Medal with four oak leaf clusters
Meritorious Service Medal with three oak leaf clusters
Air Medal
Army Commendation Medal with two oak leaf clusters
Army Achievement Medal with one silver and one bronze oak leaf clusters
Army Presidential Unit Citation
Navy Presidential Unit Citation
Valorous Unit Award
Meritorious Unit Commendation
National Defense Service Medal with one bronze service star
Southwest Asia Service Medal with service star
Afghanistan Campaign Medal with service star
Iraq Campaign Medal with three service stars
Global War on Terrorism Expeditionary Medal
Global War on Terrorism Service Medal
Armed Forces Service Medal
Army Service Ribbon
Army Overseas Service Ribbon with bronze award numeral 5
United Nations Medal
Kuwait Liberation Medal (Saudi Arabia)
Kuwait Liberation Medal (Kuwait)

Military offices
Preceded by Theodore D. Martin	Commandant of Cadets of the United States Military Academy; 2013–2014	Succeeded by John C. Thomson III
Preceded by John W. Nicholson Jr.	Commanding General of the 82nd Airborne Division; 2014–2016	Succeeded by Michael E. Kurilla
Preceded by Steven M. Shepro	Vice Director for Strategy, Plans, and Policy of the Joint Staff; 2016–2017	Succeeded by Glen D. VanHerck
Preceded by Kenneth F. McKenzie Jr.	Director for Strategy, Plans, and Policy of the Joint Staff; 2017–2019	Succeeded by David W. Allvin
Preceded by Raymond A. Thomas	Commander of the United States Special Operations Command; 2019–2022	Succeeded by Bryan P. Fenton
