= Le Ray =

Le Ray may refer to:

Places:

- Le Ray, New York, U.S.
- Le Ray Township, Blue Earth County, Minnesota, U.S.

People:

- Dani Le Ray (born 1982), Australian gymnast
- Jacques-Donatien Le Ray (1726–1803), French "Father of the American Revolution"

== See also ==
- Leray, a surname
