= Earl Stroh =

American artist (1924–2005)

Earl W. Stroh
- Born: 1924; Buffalo, New York
- Died: 2005 (aged 80–81)
- Education: Art Institute of Buffalo, Art Students League of New York
- Known for: Taos Modernism
- Awards: Helene Wurlitzer Foundation

Earl Stroh (1924-2005) was an American artist who was affiliated with the Taos Moderns group of painters.

== Education ==
He received his education at the Art Institute of Buffalo, and went on to train at the Art Students League, New York, and the University of New Mexico.

== Career ==
In the 1940s, the Helene Wurlitzer Foundation, awarded him a grant to produce his work, and Helene Wurlitzer became his patron. In 1947, he moved to Taos, New Mexico where he continued to live an work throughout the rest of his career.

Stroh participated in numerous exhibitions, including those as the Modern Art Museum of Fort Worth, New Mexico Museum of Art, Galerie Seder (Paris), the Roswell Museum and Art Center, the Library of Congress, the Harwood Museum of Art, the Oklahoma Art Center.

In the 1970s Stroh was invited to be an artist in residence at the Tamarind Institute to develop a series of lithographs; these works were later shown at the Harwood Museum in Taos.

Stroh died in 2005 in Taos.

== Collections ==
Stroh's work is included in the permanent collections of the McNay Art Museum, the Buffalo AKG Art Museum (formerly the Albright Knox Gallery), the Dallas Museum of Art, the Art Institute of Chicago, the Indianapolis Museum of Art, among other venues.

An archive of Stroh's papers from 1960 to 1983 are held in the Archives of American Art of the Smithsonian Institution.
