= Rye (surname) =

Rye is a surname. Notable people with the surname include:

- Angela Rye, born 1971, Political commentator
- Barbara Lynette Rye, born 1952, Australian botanist
- Daphne Rye (1916–1992), English theatre actress and director
- Maria Rye (1829–1903), English social reformer
- Michael Rye (1918–2012), American voice actor
- Olaf Rye (1791–1849), Dano-Norwegian military officer
- Roger Rye, MP for Kent
- Stellan Rye (1880–1914), Danish-born film director
- Thomas Clark Rye (1863–1953), American politician
