= Joseph Ray =

Joseph Ray may refer to:

- Joseph Warren Ray (1849–1928), American politician
- Joie Ray (runner) (Joseph W. Ray; 1894–1978), American middle-distance runner
- Joie Ray (racing driver) (Joseph Reynolds Ray, Jr.; 1923–2007), American race car driver
- Joe Ray, one third of Nero, a dubstep and drum and bass band from London, UK
- Joe Ray (artist), American artist
