= Robert Rae (agricultural scientist) =

Scottish agricultural scientist (1894–1971)

Sir Robert Rae, CB (9 June 1894 – 10 December 1971) was a Scottish agricultural scientist.

== Early life ==
Robert Rae was born on 9 June 1894, the son of the Rev. Robert Rae and Kate, née Wilson. Rae was educated at the University of Edinburgh and then the Edinburgh and East of Scotland College of Agriculture.

== Career ==
Rae initially served in the Scottish Horse in the First World War, but from 1917 he was transferred to the 21st Lancers. On demobilisation, he took up a lectureship at the East Anglian Institute of Agriculture in 1920, but within a year he had moved to the Hertfordshire Institute of Agriculture to be its Vice-Principal. From 1925 to 1933, he was simultaneously employed at The Queen's University, Belfast (as a lecturer and from 1932 as Professor of Crop and Animal Husbandry), and at Northern Ireland's Ministry of Agriculture as Head of Crop and Animal Husbandry Research. He was Professor of Agriculture at the University of Reading from 1933 to 1944, when he became agricultural attaché to the British Embassy in Washington, DC. In 1946, he was appointed Under-Secretary at the Ministry of Agriculture, Fisheries and Food and then, from 1948 to 1959, he was Director of the National Agricultural Advisory Service.

Rae was appointed a Companion of the Order of the Bath in 1952 and a Knight Bachelor six years later. He died on 10 December 1971 at the Isle of Man, aged 77; his widow, Constance Alma, daughter of George King, had died in 1965 and they had no children.
