= Wroe =

Wroe or WROE may refer to:

== People ==
- Corban Wroe (born 1992), Australian basketball player
- James Wroe (1788–1844), radical English newspaper editor
- John Wroe (1782–1863), British evangelist
- Nicky Wroe (born 1985), English soccer player
- Richard Wroe (1641–1717), English Christian preacher
- Sean Wroe (born 1985), Australian sprinter
- Stephen Wroe Australian paleontologist

== Other ==
- Wroe Alderson (1898–1965), Marketing pioneer
- WROE-LP, a low-power radio station (95.7 FM) licensed to serve Roanoke, Virginia, United States
- WBDL-LD, a low-power television station (channel 18, virtual 8) licensed to serve Elk Mount, Wisconsin, United States, which held the call sign WROE-LP from 2010 to 2014
- WYDR, a radio station (94.3 FM) licensed to serve Neenah-Menasha, Wisconsin, which held the call sign WROE from 1971 to 2010
