= Time Cube =

American conspiracy website (1997–2015)

- The layout and writing style of the Time Cube website
- Website type: Personal web page and conspiracy blog
- Creator: Otis Eugene "Gene" Ray
- Commercial: No
- Launched: 1997; 29 years ago
- Current status: Inactive (Note: Ray's website domain names expired on August 24, 2015, and Time Cube was last archived by the Wayback Machine on January 12, 2016 (January 10–14).)

Time Cube was a pseudoscientific personal web page set up in 1997 by Otis Eugene "Gene" Ray. It was a self-published outlet for Ray's "theory of everything", also called "Time Cube", which posits that each day actually consists of four days occurring simultaneously. Ray described himself as the "wisest man on earth" and a "godlike being with superior intelligence who has absolute evidence and proof" for his views. Ray asserted that the academic world had not taken Time Cube seriously and that all modern sciences are participating in a worldwide conspiracy to omit his theory.

Ray died in March 2015, and the Time Cube website registration expired in August 2015.

== Website ==
The Time Cube website did not have a navigation structure such as a menu or a central home page; instead, it was one long continuous page. A large amount of self-invented jargon is used throughout, often never defined. In one paragraph, Ray claimed that:

"My wisdom so antiquates known knowledge, that a psychiatrist examining my behavior, eccentric by his academic single corner knowledge, knows no course other than to judge me schizoprenic [sic]."

Adi Robertson of The Verge commented that Ray's theory of time is "an incredibly confusing one peppered with racism and homophobia".

== Time Cube concept ==
Diagram illustrating an aspect of the Time Cube theory which Ray describes as "LIFE ENCOMPASSES A 4–16 CUBE PRINCIPLE"

Ray's personal model of reality, called "Time Cube", states that all of modern physics and education is wrong, and argues that, among many other things, Greenwich Time is a global conspiracy. He uses various graphs (along with pictures of himself) that purport to show that four moments—SUN-UP, MID-DAY, SUN-DOWN, and MID-NIGHT—are experienced separately and simultaneously as earth rotates, making up four days.

The following quotation from the website illustrates the recurring theme:

When the Sun shines upon Earth, 2 – major Time points are created on opposite sides of Earth – known as Midday and Midnight. Where the 2 major Time forces join, synergy creates 2 new minor Time points we recognize as Sunup and Sundown. The 4-equidistant time points can be considered as Time Square imprinted upon the circle of Earth. In a single rotation of the Earth sphere, each Time corner point rotates through the other 3-corner Time points, thus creating 16 corners, 96 hours, and 4-simultaneous 24-hour Days within a single rotation of Earth – equated to a Higher Order of Life Time Cube.

Ray offered $1,000 or $10,000 to anyone who could prove his views wrong.

== Reception ==
Ray spoke about Time Cube at the Massachusetts Institute of Technology in January 2002 as part of a student-organized extra-curricular event during the independent activities period. He repeated his $10,000 offer for professors to disprove his notions at the event; none attempted it. John C. Dvorak wrote in PC Magazine that "Metasites that track crackpot sites often say this is the number one nutty site." He also characterized the site's content as "endless blather". When asked by Martin Sargent in 2003 how it felt to be an Internet celebrity, Ray stated that it was not a position he wanted, but something he felt he had to do as "no writer or speaker understands the Time Cube." Ray also spoke about Time Cube at the Georgia Institute of Technology in April 2005, delivering a speech in which he attacked the instruction offered by academics.

In 2005, Brett Hanover made Above God, a short documentary film about Ray and Time Cube. The film was likely named after one of Ray's websites, which criticized the idea that God exists. Hanover's film won awards for Best Documentary at the Indie Memphis Film Festival and the Atlanta Underground Film Festival.
