= Leray =

Leray or LeRay is a surname. Notable people with the surname include:

- David Leray (born 1984), French footballer
- Francis Xavier Leray (1825–1887), American prelate of the Roman Catholic Church
- Jean Leray (1906–1998), French mathematician
- Marie-Pierre Leray (born 1975), French figure skater
- Coi Leray, stage name of American rapper and singer Coi Leray Collins (born 1997)

== See also ==
- LeRay Mansion, Fort Drum, New York, United States, on the National Register of Historic Places

== See also ==
- Le Ray (disambiguation)
