= Norman W. Ray =

Former American Navy vice admiral

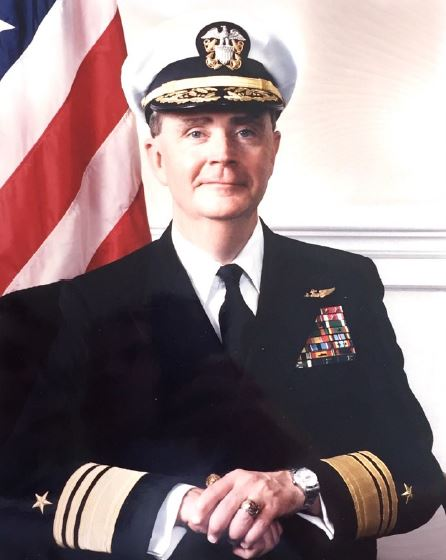
- Born: 25 June 1942 (age 84); Hillsboro, Illinois U.S.
- Military career
- Allegiance: United States
- Branch: United States Navy
- Service years: 1964–1995
- Rank: Vice admiral

Norman Wilson Ray (born 25 June 1942) is a retired vice admiral in the United States Navy who served Deputy Chairman of the NATO Military Committee from 1992 to 1995. Ray graduated from the United States Naval Academy in 1964. After his retirement, he later served as the president of a defense contacting firm.
