= Patrociño Barela =

Wood carver (1900–1964)

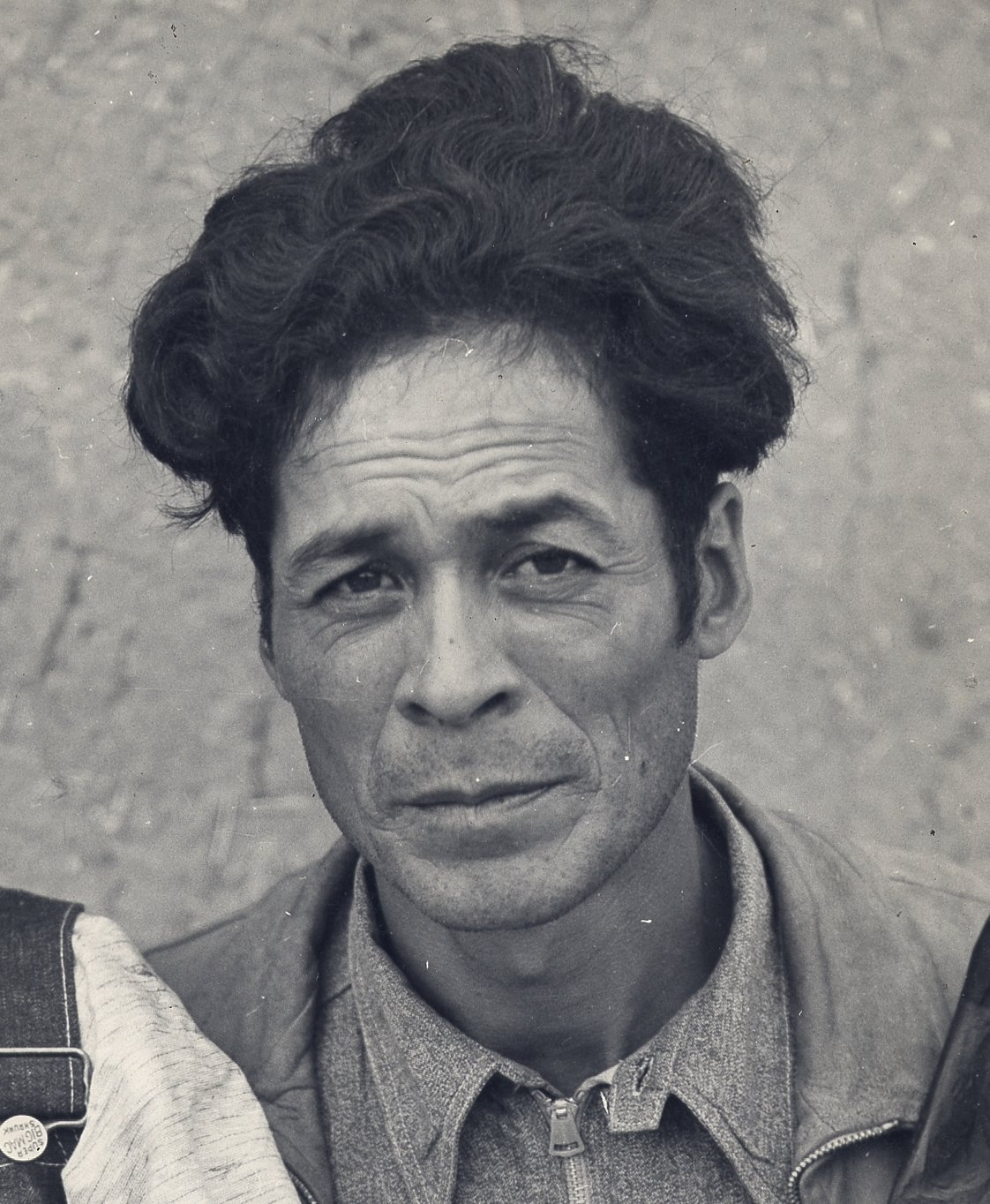
- Patrociño Barela
- Born: c. 1900; Bisbee, Arizona, US
- Died: October 24, 1964 (aged 64); Taos, New Mexico, US
- Resting place: Nuestra Señora de Dolores Cemetery, Canon, Taos County, New Mexico
- Occupation: Artist
- Known for: carving

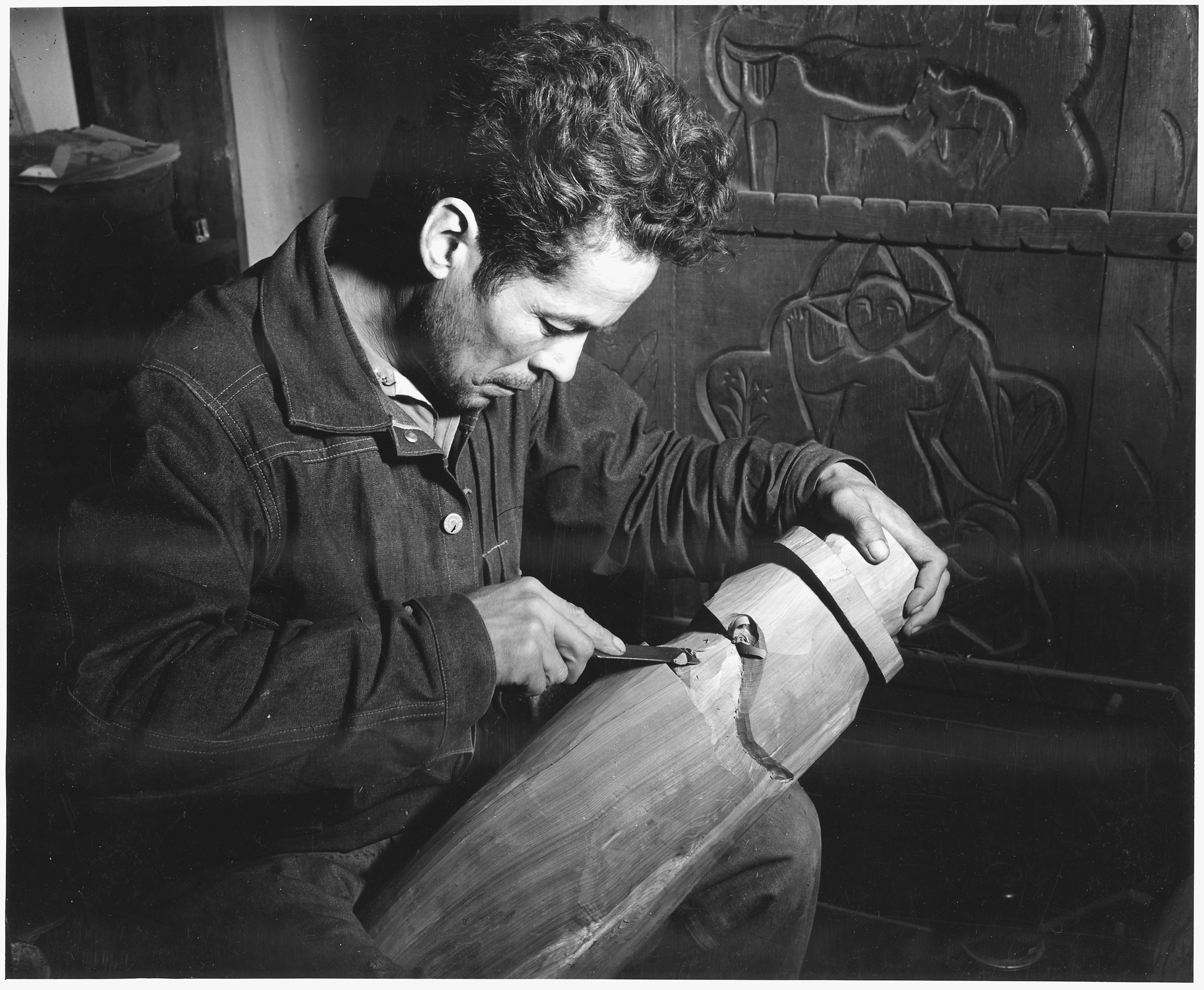
Barela at work in his studio, 1941

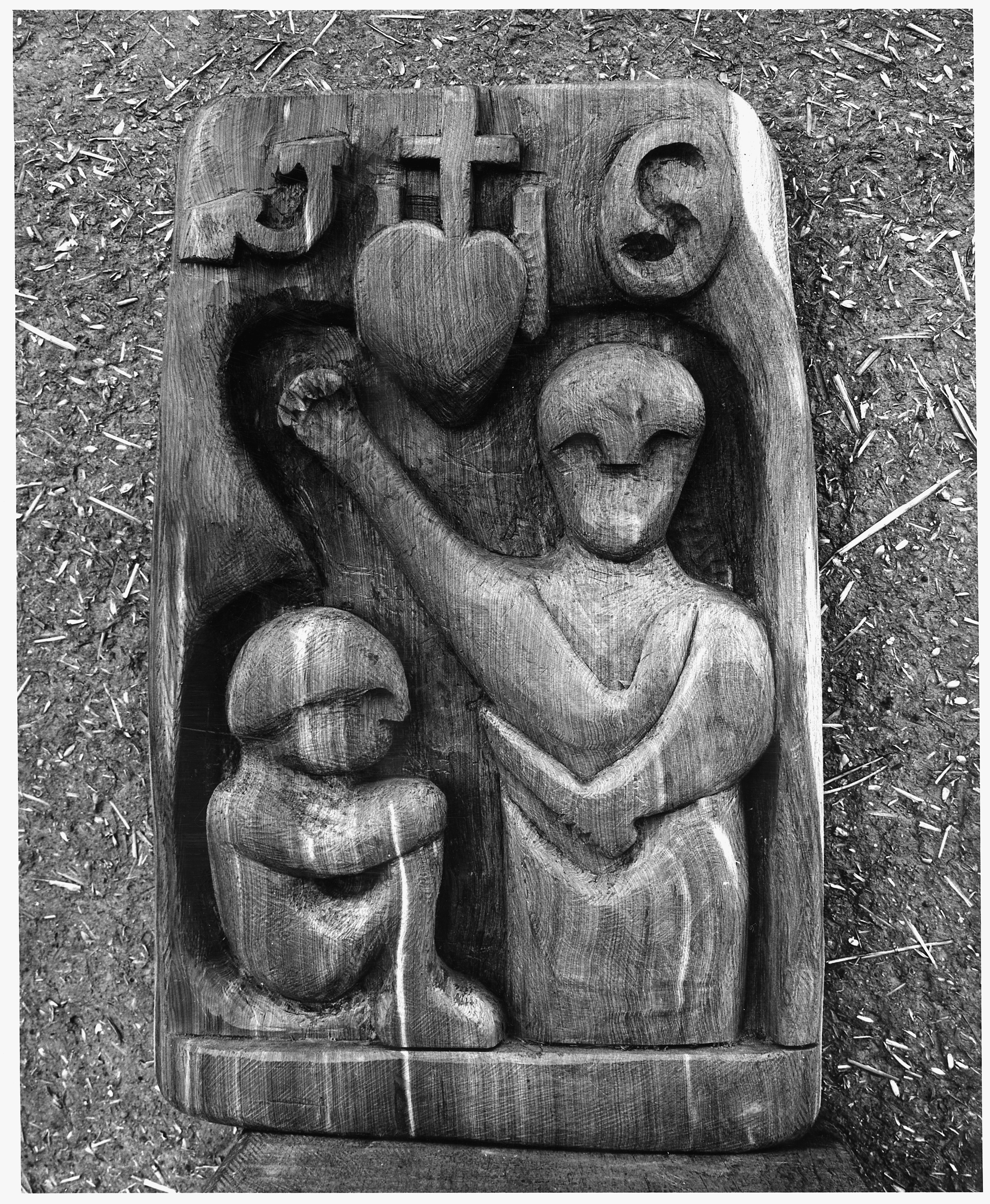
Wood carving by Patrociño Barela

Patrociño Barela, also known as Patrocinio Barela or Patrocino Barela (1900–1964), was a self-taught wood carver. Because of the religious nature of his subjects he was called a santero, but he did secular work too. His work was shown at the Museum of Modern Art in New York with other artists of the Federal Art Project and he was feted as "a discovery." He was the first Mexican-American artist to receive national recognition.

== Early life ==
Patrociño Barela's date of birth is unclear, but is assumed from his various accounts to have occurred between 1900 and 1904. His mother and younger sister both died early in his life, but these dates likewise are not clear. Barela did not attend school for more than a few weeks and was not able to write. He worked as a steelworker, miner, on the railway, as a farmhand, and as a unionized carpenter. In 1930, he married a widow and eventually with her had three more children (giving them seven in total).

== Career ==
He found his calling as a carver of sacred objects in 1931. He repaired a figure of St Antonio and he later recounted that he knew that someone was going to make 20 dollars from his work and he was promised five. Although the five dollars never appeared, Barela realized that his work had value and he continued to make figures. He was taken on by the Works Progress Administration working with a horse and cart. His carvings were spotted and he was set to do those instead, eventually as part of the Public Works of Art Project. Because he was illiterate he was given a sheet filled with squares to which he would add a cross every day to record his work. This was in 1935 and eventually his work was exhibited at the Museum of Modern Art but he had no ambition to see the eight objects chosen as part of a Federal Arts Project exhibition there. He was lauded by the museum as "the most dramatic discovery" and he was called "discovery of the year" by Time magazine. Two other exhibitions of his work in 1939 further established Barela nationally, the San Francisco Golden Gate Exposition and the American Art Today show at the New York World's Fair.

He was discovered and was regarded almost immediately as a leading artist with his fluid sculptures carved from juniper wood. He was driven to carve and he chose subjects from the Bible or imaginary subjects which usually had a spiritual nature.

== Death ==
Barela died in a fire at the age of 64. His body was found in the corner of his studio after a fire overnight and it is presumed that inebriation combined with wood shavings and his own cigarette had created the fire. He was living at his studio in Cañon, near Taos, New Mexico still poor and illiterate but famous. His legacy is well regarded – the Taos art colony regard him as the first Mexican American artist to receive national recognition.

== Legacy ==
The largest collection of his work is at the Harwood Museum of Art in Taos, part of the University of New Mexico. Another collection is on permanent exhibition at the Millicent Rogers Museum in Taos and consists of both three-dimensional carvings and a large relief-carved door. His other legacy is the family of artists including children and grandchildren, Luis and Daniel Barela, who carry on the tradition.
