= Robbie Ray (racing driver) =

American racing driver (born 1982)

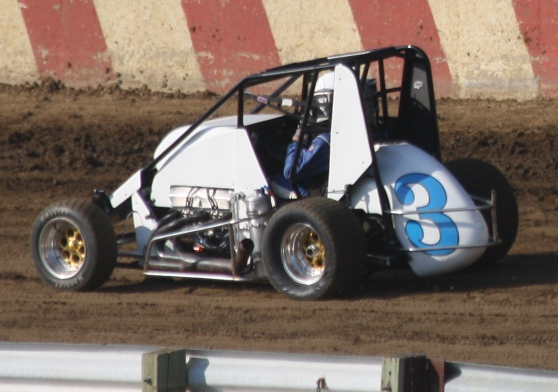
Ray in his USAC Midget car at Angell Park Speedway in 2012

Robbie Ray (born November 3, 1982, in Davenport, Iowa) is an American professional auto racing driver. He races midget cars on the United States Auto Club (USAC) National tour. He won the 2003 Indiana (Midwest) regional midget championship and the 2005 national championship.

== Racing career ==
Ray began his career in go-karts at the age of nine. He is most noted for winning the United Midget Racing Association sanctioned Rushville Nationals in 2001. He won the 2003 Midwest regional (Indiana) championship and the inaugural United States Auto Club Ford Focus Midget National Championship in 2005. He won the Badger Midget Auto Racing Association 'Rookie of the Year' honors in 2007; the series mainly features races at Angell Park Speedway.
