= Dorothy Jean Ray =

American art historian

- Dorothy Tostlebe (later Ray), from a 1937 newspaper
- Born: Dorothy Jean Tostlebe; October 10, 1919; Cedar Falls, Iowa, U.S.
- Died: December 12, 2007 (aged 88); Port Townsend, Washington, U.S.
- Occupations: Ethnographer, anthropologist, writer, musician
- Spouse: Verne F. Ray

Dorothy Jean Tostlebe Ray (October 10, 1919 – December 12, 2007) was an ethnographer, anthropologist, writer, and musician, best known for her study of Native Alaskan art and culture.

== Early life and education ==
Ray was born in Cedar Rapids, Iowa, the daughter of Oscar Tostlebe and Vina Younker Tostlebe. She studied music, and played flute and piccolo. She won first place in a national student contest in 1937. She graduated from Cedar Falls High School in 1937. She earned a bachelor's degree from the University of Northern Iowa in 1941. She pursued further studies in anthropology at Radcliffe College and the University of Washington.

== Career ==
Tostlebe was a teacher as a young woman. She took a two-month bicycle tour of New England in 1940 with a friend, and another bike tour of the Eastern states in 1941. She moved to Alaska in 1945, and played piano in a dance band at Marks Airfield in Nome; she was also an accompanist for the University of Alaska chorus. She prospected for gold, and worked at the Geophysical institute and at the 1953 Alaska Science Conference. She interviewed and photographed traditional ivory carvers in Nome in the 1950s. She taught herself to read Russian to research the 17th- and 18th-century history of the Bering Strait. She collected Alaskan Native art and artifacts in her work, including some 19th century items. She donated her collections with her research and field notes, to the University of Alaska Museum of the North collection in Fairbanks, in 1996.

Ray received honorary doctorates from the University of Alaska Fairbanks and her alma mater, the University of Northern Iowa. Additional honors include the Dorothy Jean Ray Anthropology Scholarship at the University of Northern Iowa.

== Publications ==
In addition to a number of published books, Ray wrote articles and papers published in journals including Alaska History, Alaska Journal, Alaska, American Indian Art, Arctic Anthropology, Names, Journal of the West, The Journal of Presbyterian History, and Pacific Northwest Quarterly. Her final book, A Legacy of Arctic Art (1996), has been described as being both a catalog and a memoir of the author's long career.

=== Books ===
- Graphic Arts of the Alaskan Eskimo (1969)
- Eskimo Masks: Art and Ceremony (1975) ISBN 0-295-95353-5
- Eskimo Art: Tradition and Innovation in North Alaska (1977) ISBN 0-295-95518-X
- Artists of the Tundra and the Sea (1980) ISBN 0-295-95732-8
- Ethnohistory in the Arctic: The Bering Strait Eskimo (1983) ISBN 0-919642-98-5
- Aleut and Eskimo Art (1986) ISBN 0-295-96410-3
- The Eskimos of Bering Strait, 1650-1898 (1992) ISBN 0-295-97122-3
- A Legacy of Arctic Art (1996, with Aldona Jonaitis) ISBN 0-295-97518-0

=== Articles ===
- "Happy Jack: King of the Ivory Carvers" (1964)
- "Nineteenth Century Settlement and Subsistence Patterns in Bering Strait" (1964)
- "Sheldon Jackson and the Reindeer Industry of Alaska" (1965)
- "Pictographs Near Bering Strait, Alaska" (1966)
- "Land Tenure and Polity of the Bering Strait Eskimos" (1967)
- "Eskimo Place Names in Bering Strait and Vicinity" (1971)
- "Early Maritime Trade with the Eskimo of Bering Strait and the Introduction of Firearms" (1975)
- "Haapy Jack and His Artistry" (1989)

=== Essays and poems ===
In college, Ray was editor of the student literary magazine The Purple Pen, and contributed essays and poems to the publication between 1939 and 1942.

- "Rudolph" (1939, essay)
- "Front Page News" and "One Side of the Hill" (1939, poems)
- "Deception", "My Life", "To the End of Time", "Unknown Valleys", and "Linocut" (1940, poems)
- "My Friend, Mr. Thoreau" (1941, essay)
- "I Am Twenty-One" (1942, poem)

== Personal life ==
Tostlebe married to Stanley Thompson in 1942, and had a son, Eric. She married fellow anthropologist and author Verne F. Ray in 1954. Her husband died in 2003, and she died in 2007, at the age of 88, in Port Townsend, Washington.
