= Thomas L. Baptiste =

United States Air Force general

Lieutenant General Thomas L. Baptiste was the Deputy Chairman of the NATO Military Committee, in Brussels, Belgium. He entered the United States Air Force in 1973. He has held various leadership positions, and has commanded a fighter squadron, operations group and the Cheyenne Mountain Operations Center, Cheyenne Mountain Air Station, Colo.

General Baptiste is a command pilot and has flown nearly 3,000 hours, including nearly 60 combat hours in the F-16 supporting Operation PROVIDE COMFORT.

In 1973, he earned a Bachelor of Science degree in business administration-finance, from California State University, Chico.

In 2010, Lt. Gen. Thomas L. Baptiste was appointed president and executive director of the National Center for Simulation, a non-profit, national membership organization (based in Orlando, Florida) which works to expand awareness of simulation modeling, training, and applications for the military, healthcare, transportation, education, and technology sectors.
