= Robert R. Ray =

American politician

Robert R. Ray was an American soldier and politician. He served in the Union Army and as a sheriff and state legislator in Louisiana. He and John Gair were driven from office by violent white supremacists and White Leaguers.

Ray was part of the State Colored Men's Convention of 1873. He represented East Feliciana Parish, Louisiana from 1874 to 1876.

== See also ==
- African American officeholders from the end of the Civil War until before 1900
