= Lieutenant general (United States) =

Military rank of the United States

- Three-star insignia of the rank of lieutenant general. Style and method of wear may vary between different uniforms and different service branches.

- Shoulder boards
- Country: United States
- Service branch: United States Army; United States Marine Corps; United States Air Force; United States Space Force
- Abbreviation: LTG (Army); LtGen (Marine Corps); Lt Gen (Air Force and Space Force)
- Rank: Three-star
- NATO rank code: OF-8
- Non-NATO rank: O-9
- Next higher rank: General
- Next lower rank: Major general
- Equivalent ranks: Vice admiral in the other uniformed services which use naval ranks

In the United States Armed Forces, a lieutenant general is a three-star general officer in the United States Army, Marine Corps, Air Force, and Space Force.

A lieutenant general ranks above a major general (Note: The rank of major general originally began as sergeant major general, in the British Army, and was junior to the rank of lieutenant general. Over time, "sergeant" was dropped and by the late 17th/early 18th century it had been shortened to major general. It was first used in the newly formed Continental Army of the United Colonies (soon to be United States) on 17 June 1775, assigned to Artemas Ward and Charles Lee – second and third in command to Lt. General (rank at that time, as commander of the Continental Army) George Washington. As a result, the rank of lieutenant general continues to be senior to major general, even though the rank of major has always been senior to the rank of lieutenant.) and below a general. It is abbreviated as LTG in the Army, LtGen in the Marine Corps, and Lt Gen in the Air Force and Space Force and is equivalent to the rank of vice admiral in the United States uniformed services that use naval ranks. The pay grade of lieutenant general is O-9.

== Statutory limits ==
The United States Code explicitly limits the total number of generals that may be concurrently active to 219 for the Army, 64 for the Marine Corps, 171 for the Air Force, and 21 for the Space Force. For the Army and Air Force, no more than about 25% of the service's active duty general officers may have more than two stars; for the Space Force, the corresponding ratio is set at one-third of the total allowed number of active duty general officers. Some of these slots can be reserved by statute. Officers serving in certain intelligence positions are not counted against either limit, including the deputy director of the Central Intelligence Agency. The president may also add three-star slots to one service if they are offset by removing an equivalent number from other services. All statutory limits may be waived at the president's discretion during time of war or national emergency.

== Appointment and tour length ==
The three-star grade goes hand-in-hand with the position of office to which it is linked, so the rank is temporary. Officers may only achieve three-star grade if they are appointed to positions that require the officer to hold such a rank. Their rank expires with the expiration of their term of office, which is usually set by statute. Lieutenant generals are nominated for appointment by the president from any eligible officers holding the rank of brigadier general or above, who also meet the requirements for the position, with the advice of the Secretary of Defense and the Chairman of the Joint Chiefs of Staff. The nominee must be confirmed via majority vote by the Senate before the appointee can take office and thus assume the rank. The standard tour length for most lieutenant general positions is three years but some are set four or more years by statute.

Extensions of the standard tour length can be approved, within statutory limits, by their respective service secretaries, the Secretary of Defense, the president, or Congress but these are rare, as they block other officers from being promoted. Some statutory limits under the U.S. Code can be waived in times of national emergency or war. Three-star ranks may also be given by an act of Congress but this is extremely rare.

U.S. Lieutenant General Rank Flags

Flag of a Lieutenant General in the United States Army.

Flag of a Chaplain's Corps Lieutenant General in the United States Army. (There has never been a LTG Chaplain)

Flag of a Lieutenant General in the United States Army Medical Department.

Flag of a Lieutenant General in the United States Marine Corps.

Flag of a Lieutenant General in the United States Air Force.

Flag of a Lieutenant General in the United States Space Force.

== Retirement ==
Other than voluntary retirement, the statute sets a number of mandates for retirement. Lieutenant generals must retire after 38 years of service unless appointed for promotion or reappointed to grade to serve longer. Otherwise, all general officers must retire the month after their 64th birthday. However, the Secretary of Defense can defer a three-star officer's retirement until the officer's 66th birthday and the president can defer it until the officer's 68th birthday.

General officers typically retire well in advance of the statutory age and service limits, so as not to impede the upward career mobility of their juniors. Since there is a finite number of three-star slots available to each service, typically one officer must leave office before another can be promoted. Maintaining a three-star rank is a game of musical chairs; once an officer vacates a position bearing that rank, they have 60 days to be appointed or reappointed to a position of equal or higher importance or involuntarily retire. Historically, officers leaving three-star positions were allowed to revert to their permanent two-star ranks to mark time in lesser jobs until statutory retirement, but now such officers are expected to retire immediately to avoid obstructing the promotion flow.

== History ==
During the Quasi-War with France, President John Adams promoted George Washington to lieutenant general to celebrate his service in the American Revolution. The rank of lieutenant general would not be awarded to an active American military commander until Ulysses S. Grant was promoted sixty years later during the American Civil War, to recognize his position as commander of all Union armies.

On February 28, 1855, President Franklin Pierce nominated Winfield Scott to be breveted lieutenant general, effective March 29, 1847, as an honor for his capture Veracruz and San Juan de Ulúa, during the Mexican–American War.

The grade was re-established by a vote in House of Representatives on 1 February 1864, with 96 for and 41 against. On June 1, 1888, the rank was merged with General of the Army and discontinued.

== Modern use ==
An Army or Marine Corps lieutenant general typically commands a corps-sized unit (20,000 to 45,000 soldiers for an Army Corps and a similar number of Marines for a Marine Expeditionary Force), while an Air Force lieutenant general commands a large Numbered Air Force consisting of several wings or a smaller USAF Major Command (MAJCOM) such as the Air Force Special Operations Command or the Air Force Reserve Command. Additionally, lieutenant generals of all services serve as high-level staff officers at various major command headquarters and The Pentagon, often as the heads of their departments. In 2014 five women were serving as lieutenant generals in the US Army.

After the close of the Second World War, generals were normally promoted permanently to brigadier general and major general, with temporary promotions to lieutenant general and general to fill senior positions as needed. In theory, a general vacates their three or four-star rank at the termination of their assignment unless placed in an equal ranking billet. Douglas MacArthur, who served as a four-star general and Army Chief of Staff, reverted to two stars after his CoS tour ended but chose to stay on active duty in the United States Army.

The practice of using lieutenant general and general grades as a temporary rank continues, with the President and the Department of Defense creating temporary or indefinite three- and four-star assignments, with a fixed term of office, with the approval of the Senate. Even with the temporary status, such officers are also almost always granted permanent retirement in the last grade they held with the satisfactory completion of at least two or three years in grade.

== Notable lieutenant generals ==
All of these lieutenant generals of the United States achieved sufficient notability to get their own entries on the English-language wikipedia:

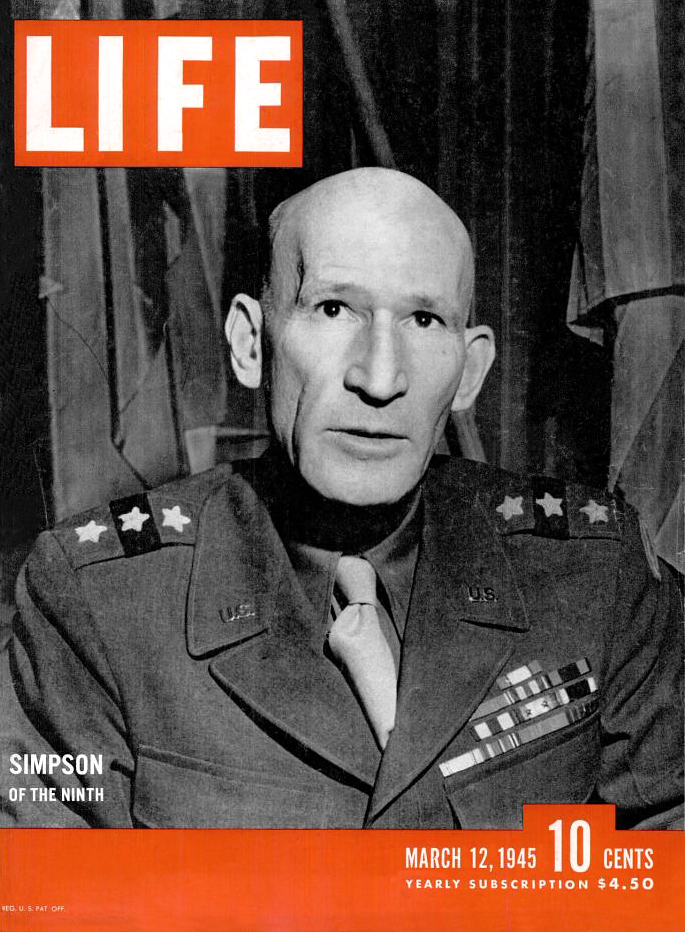
Lieutenant General William Hood Simpson wearing three-star rank, 1945

=== Historic ===
Listed in order of receiving the rank:

- George Washington, the first officer to be appointed to the grade of lieutenant general. He was later posthumously promoted to General of the Armies of the United States in 1976.
- Winfield Scott, received a brevet promotion to lieutenant general
- Ulysses S. Grant, later promoted to General of the Army of the United States
- William T. Sherman, later promoted to General of the Army of the United States
- Philip Sheridan, later promoted to General of the Army of the United States
- John Schofield, while serving as Commanding General of the United States Army
- Nelson A. Miles, while serving as Commanding General of the United States Army
- Thomas Holcomb, the first U.S. Marine promoted to the rank as Commandant of the Marine Corps in January 1942

=== World War II ===
- Frank Maxwell Andrews, U.S. Army Air Forces, commander of U.S. Forces in the European Theater, killed in an air crash
- Simon Bolivar Buckner Jr., commander of U.S. Tenth Army, posthumously promoted to General
- Jimmy Doolittle, U.S. Army Air Forces, leader of the Doolittle Raid on Japan in World War II and commander of the U.S. Eighth Air Force, Twelfth Air Force and Fifteenth Air Force, later promoted to general, U.S. Air Force, after retirement
- Hugh Aloysius Drum, commander of U.S. First Army
- Lucian Truscott, commander of the U.S. Fifth Army
- Ira C. Eaker, U.S. Army Air Forces, commander of U.S. Eighth Air Force, later posthumously promoted to general in 1986
- Delos Carleton Emmons, commander of the Hawaiian Department
- Lloyd Fredendall, commander of U.S. Second Army
- Leslie Groves, who ran the Manhattan Project and oversaw The Pentagon design and construction.
- Millard Harmon, U.S. Army Air Forces, commander of Army Air Forces Pacific, lost during plane flight
- Thomas Holcomb, U.S. Marine Corps, Commandant of the Marine Corps during the first half of World War II, later promoted to general on retirement
- William S. Knudsen, director of production, Office of the Under Secretary of War. The first civilian to enter the Army at that rank.
- Lesley J. McNair, commander of Army Ground Forces, later posthumously promoted to General
- Richard K. Sutherland, chief of staff to General of the Army Douglas MacArthur, present on the USS Missouri (BB-63) for the Empire of Japan's surrender signing.
- George S. Patton, commander of U.S. Third Army, later promoted to General
- Joseph Stilwell, Commander of the China Burma India Theater and later Deputy Allied Commander in China.

=== 1950s through 1980s; Korean War, Vietnam War, Cold War ===
- Lewis B. "Chesty" Puller, U.S. Marine Corps, the most decorated Marine in Marine Corps history (only Marine ever to be awarded the Navy Cross five times)
- Lewis Blaine Hershey, head of the Selective Service System 1940–70, lieutenant general 1956–70, then promoted to general, retired 1973 at age 79.
- Edgar S. Harris Jr., former chief of staff and vice commander in chief of the Strategic Air Command and former commander of the Eighth Air Force.
- Robert Sink, former commander of the 506th Parachute Infantry Regiment (Band of Brothers), the XVIII Airborne Corps and the Strategic Army Corps.
- Hal Moore, former commander of the 1st Cavalry Division
- Eugene Forrester, commander of United States Army Pacific (Western Command) from 1981 through .1983
- Julius W. Becton Jr., former commander of the VII Corps in Europe, director of the Office of Foreign Disaster Assistance in the United States Agency for International Development (US AID), and Director of FEMA from 1985 to 1989
- William Eldridge Odom, head of the National Security Agency under president Ronald Reagan, outspoken opponent of the Iraq War and warrantless wiretapping of US citizens.
- Thomas P. Stafford, U.S. Air Force, NASA astronaut, flew on Gemini 6A, Gemini 9, Apollo 10 & Apollo-Soyuz Test Project. Promoted to lieutenant general in 1979 as deputy chief of staff, research development and acquisition, Headquarters USAF, Washington D.C.

=== Post-Cold War ===
- Thomas L. Baptiste, deputy chairman, NATO Military Committee, Brussels, Belgium.
- David Barno, USA (Ret): former commander of Combined Forces Command-Afghanistan during the War in Afghanistan
- Carol A. Mutter, USMC (Ret): first woman to be promoted to lieutenant general (1 September 1996)
- Claudia J. Kennedy, USA (Ret): first woman to be promoted to lieutenant general in the United States Army (17 June 1997)
- Ricardo Sanchez, USA (Ret): former commander U.S. V Corps, former commander of US ground forces in Iraq
- Samuel V. Wilson, USA (Ret): Ranger Hall of Fame, Delta Force co-founder, former commander of the 6th Special Forces: former Deputy to director, Central Intelligence Agency, former director of the Defense Intelligence Agency, former President of Hampden-Sydney College
- John B. Sylvester: former deputy chief of staff for NATO in Bosnia-Herzegovina
- Mark Hertling
- Jack Bergman, USMC (Ret): US Congressman, former commander United States Marine Corps Reserve
- Susan Helms, United States Air Force (Ret): former commander 14th Air Force and former NASA astronaut
- Michael T. Flynn, USA (Ret): former Director of the Defense Intelligence Agency (2012–2014) and National Security Advisor (2017)
- H. R. McMaster, USA: National Security Advisor (2017–2018)
- Charles W. Hooper, USA: former Director of Defense Security Cooperation Agency (2017 - 2020)
- Nina M. Armagno, USSF: first Director of Staff, Space Staff (Since 2020)
- David J. Julazadeh, United States Air Force (Ret): Deputy Chief of Staff for Capability Development, Headquarters Supreme Allied Commander Transformation (DCOFS-CD), (2021–2024)

== See also ==
- List of active duty United States three-star officers
- United States Army officer rank insignia
- United States Marine Corps officer rank insignia
- United States Air Force officer rank insignia
- List of lieutenant generals in the United States Army before 1960
- List of lieutenant generals in the United States Air Force before 1960
- List of United States Marine Corps lieutenant generals on active duty before 1960
- List of United States Marine Corps tombstone lieutenant generals
- List of United States military leaders by rank
