= 2021 Kabul airlift =

Military evacuation following the Fall of Kabul

Evacuation from Afghanistan (2021)
- Part of the War in Afghanistan
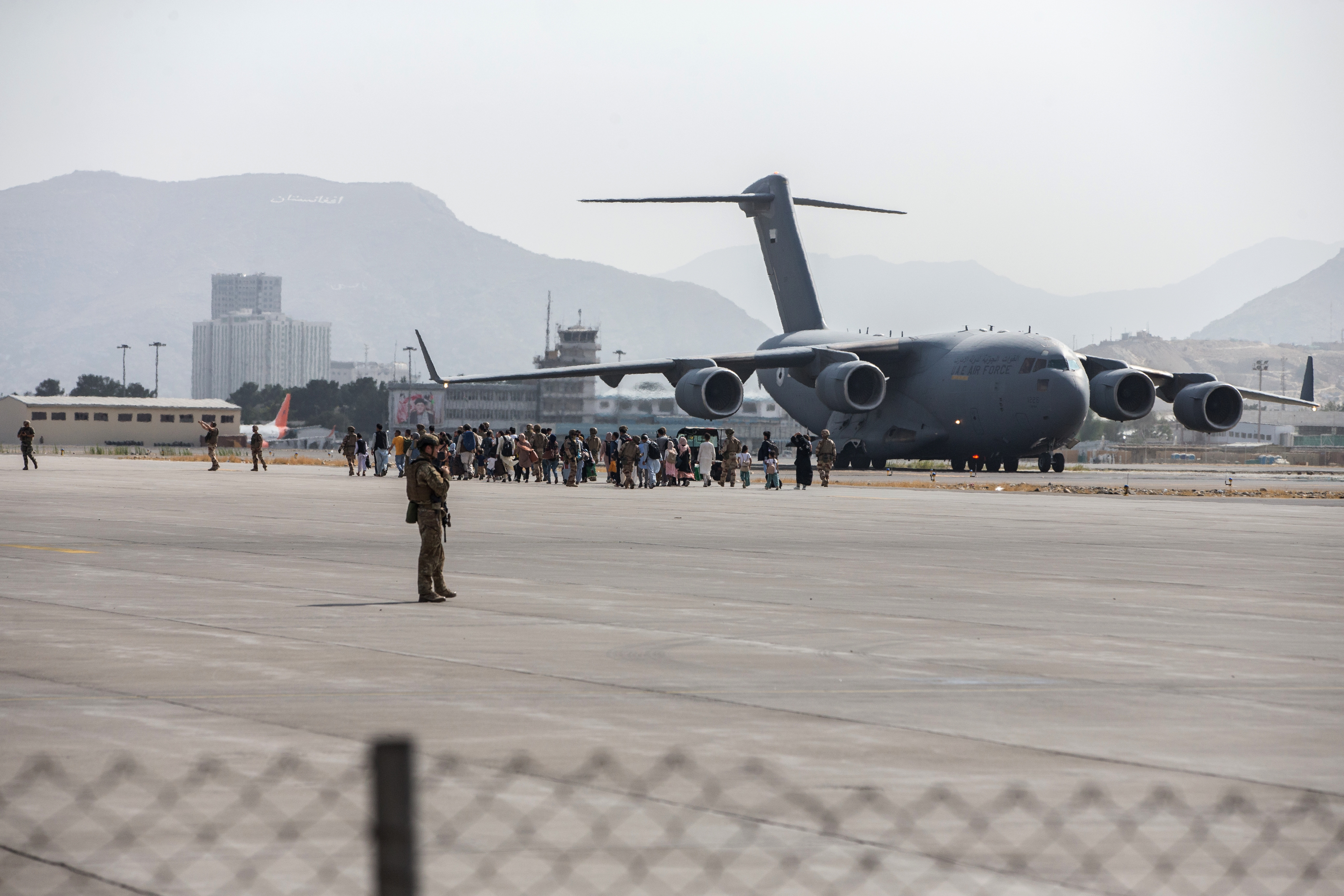
- Evacuees load on to a United Arab Emirates Air Force Boeing C-17 Globemaster III during the evacuation on 20 August 2021
- Location: Kabul, Afghanistan
- Objective: Evacuations of international diplomatic, military and civilian staff, including national civilians
- Date: 13 August 2021 – 30 August 2021
- Executed by: List: Australia; Austria; Azerbaijan; Belgium (Operation Red Kite); Canada (Operation AEGIS); Czech Republic; Denmark; Finland; France (Operation Apagan); Georgia; Germany; Greece; Hungary (Operation Sámán); India (Operation Devi Shakti); Indonesia; Ireland; Italy (Operation Aquila Omnia); Japan (Operation RJNO); Lithuania; Luxembourg; Mexico; Netherlands; New Zealand (Operation Kōkako); Norway; Pakistan Philippines; Poland; Portugal; Qatar; Romania; Russia; Slovakia; Slovenia; Singapore; South Korea (Operation Miracle); Spain (Operation Antígona); Sweden; Switzerland; Turkey; Ukraine; United Arab Emirates; United Kingdom (Operation Pitting); United States (Operation Allies Refuge); Taliban (security and logistics)
- Outcome: Over 122,000 people airlifted abroad and end of the War in Afghanistan (2001–2021)
- Casualties: 195+ killed: 159+ Afghan civilians, 13 US service members, and 3 British nationals killed during a suicide bombing at the Kabul airport; 11 Afghan civilians killed during crowd crushes at the airport; 6 Afghan civilian stowaways killed (one outside of Afghanistan); 2 unknown gunmen killed by US troops; 1 Afghan guard killed during a gunfight

Foreign nationals and some vulnerable Afghan citizens were airlifted from Kabul by the United States and its allies in 2021. The airlift followed the Taliban's rapid takeover of Afghanistan in August 2021 and during the final stages of the US and NATO troop withdrawal, marking the end of the 2001–2021 war in Afghanistan.

The Taliban took control of Kabul and declared victory on 15 August 2021, and the NATO-backed Islamic Republic of Afghanistan collapsed. With the Taliban controlling the entirety of the city except Hamid Karzai International Airport, hostilities ceased and the Taliban assisted in the evacuation effort by providing security and screening evacuees during the Biden administration.

Although some countries had previously begun small-scale evacuation efforts in the months leading up to August 2021, such as the American Operation Allies Refuge and the British Operation Pitting, the collapse of the Afghan government occurred sooner than intelligence projections had estimated, and evacuation efforts became more urgent. Several countries launched new evacuation operations, such as Canada's Operation AEGIS, India's Operation Devi Shakti, and South Korea's Operation Miracle.

The evacuation operations were one of the largest airlifts in history. Between 14 and 25 August, the US alone evacuated about 82,300 people from Hamid Karzai International Airport, including US citizens, Special Immigrant Visa applicants, and other vulnerable Afghans. In total, over 122,000 people were airlifted abroad. The evacuation was completed on August 30, one day before a deadline agreed upon with the Taliban.

== Background ==
Following the Afghan peace process, the Trump administration and Taliban signed the Doha Agreement in February 2020. Accordingly, the US agreed to withdraw all US forces from Afghanistan by 1 May 2021. The Taliban failed to honor most of its pledges in the agreement. Nonetheless, the Biden administration decided to continue with the planned withdrawal, although it pushed back the completion date first to 11 September 2021 and then to 31 August 2021.

As the US withdrawal proceeded, the Taliban and allied militant groups began a widespread offensive on 1 May 2021. In the ensuing months, the Taliban seized control of Afghanistan through a combination of negotiating wholesale surrenders of Afghan National Army units and their military offensive, capturing provincial capitals, and expanding their control from 77 districts on 13 April to 104 districts on 16 June to 223 districts on 3 August. In July 2021, the US Intelligence Community estimated that the government of Afghanistan could collapse between six and 12 months after the departure of American troops. Intelligence agencies later reduced the estimation to one month.

However, the government collapsed within days, much more rapidly than many anticipated. The Afghan National Army, poorly led and impaired by widespread corruption, was left in chaos, having only two units remained operational by mid-August: the 201st Corps and 111th Division, both based in Kabul. Intelligence projections quickly worsened. By 14 August, the Taliban had encircled Kabul. On 15 August, Kabul fell and the Taliban declared victory in the War in Afghanistan.

As the Taliban seized control, the urgency to evacuate populations vulnerable to the Taliban, including those interpreters and assistants who had worked with the Operation Enduring Freedom; the International Security Assistance Force, Operation Freedom's Sentinel and the Resolute Support Mission; Hazara people; and vulnerable women and minorities, given the treatment of women by the Taliban, gained importance.

During the evacuation, networks of U.S. military veterans, diplomats, and other volunteers used encrypted messaging apps to help Afghans navigate to the airport and secure resettlement support.

AfghanEvac, led by Shawn VanDiver, kept working with government after the collapse.

== Timeline ==
=== 13–14 August ===
After the Taliban seized all border crossings, Kabul Airport remained the only secure route out of Afghanistan. After the fall of Herat on 13 August, the US deployed an additional 3,000 troops and the UK deployed 600 troops to Kabul Airport to secure the airlifts of their nationals, embassy staff, and Afghan citizens who worked with coalition forces. US officials said at the time that all of their forces were still expected to leave Afghanistan by 31 August. On 13 August, a memorandum was sent to all staff of the US embassy to reduce "items with embassy or agency logos, American flags or items which could be misused in propaganda efforts". Diplomats were reported to be rapidly destroying classified documents and other sensitive materials. Among the documents destroyed were the passports of Afghan civilians who had applied for visas.

=== 15–16 August ===
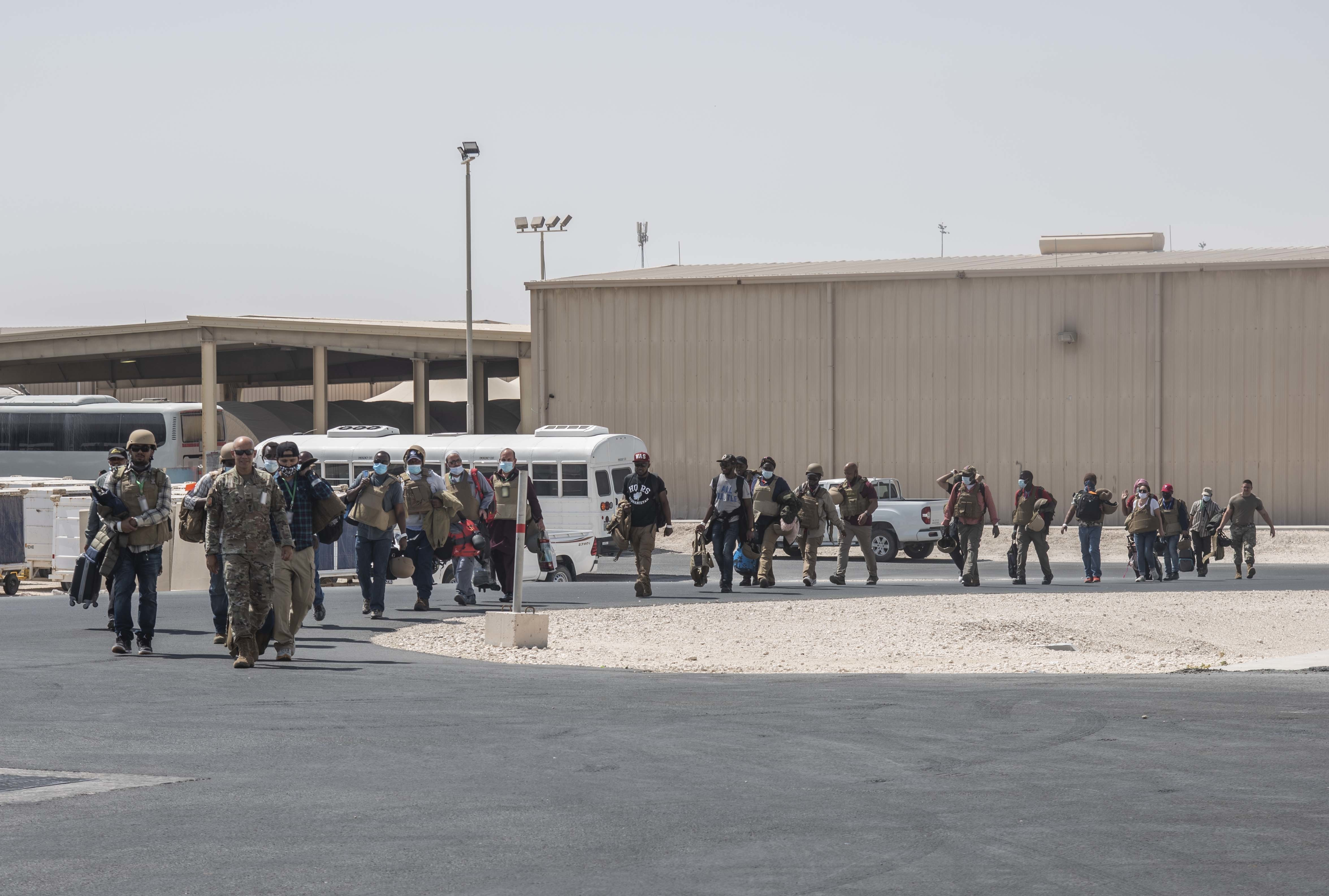
US embassy staff arriving in Al Udeid Air Base in Qatar from Afghanistan on 15 August 2021

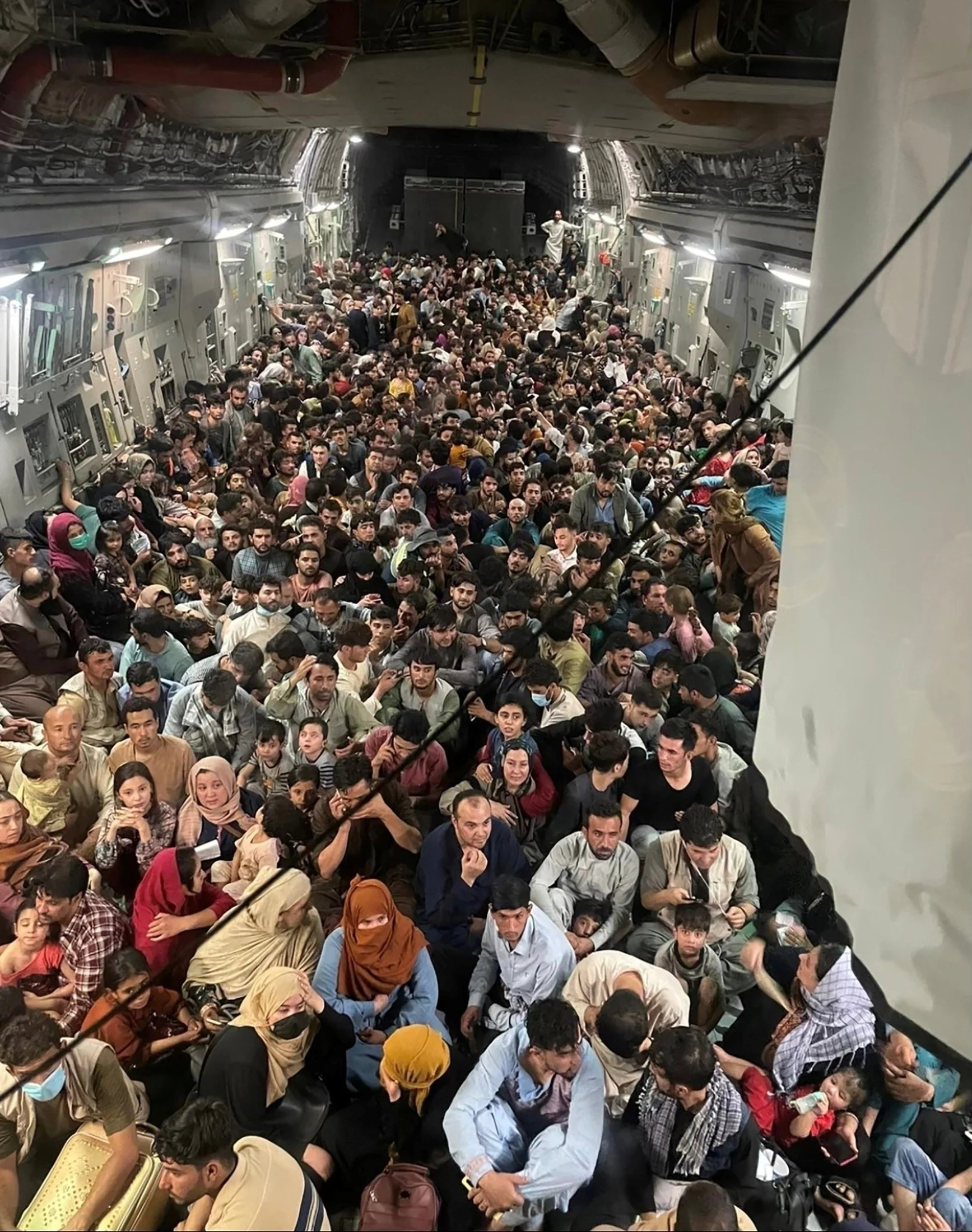
A C-17 evacuating 823 passengers out of Kabul on 15 August

As the Taliban surrounded and began entering Kabul, US Army CH-47 Chinook, UH-60 Black Hawk and State Department Air Wing CH-46 Sea Knight helicopters began landing at the US embassy to carry out evacuations. A convoy of armored sport utility vehicles (SUVs) was seen departing the embassy grounds, and an attack helicopter was reportedly seen deploying flares in the area to defend against potential shoot-downs. Along with the embassy personnel, 5,000 US troops and some NATO troops remained in the city. The US government later authorized the deployment of 1,000 more troops from the 82nd Airborne Division to the airport, bolstering troop presence in Kabul to 6,000 to facilitate the evacuations.

External videos
- A widely-shared video shows Afghans running alongside an airplane taking off at Kabul airport.

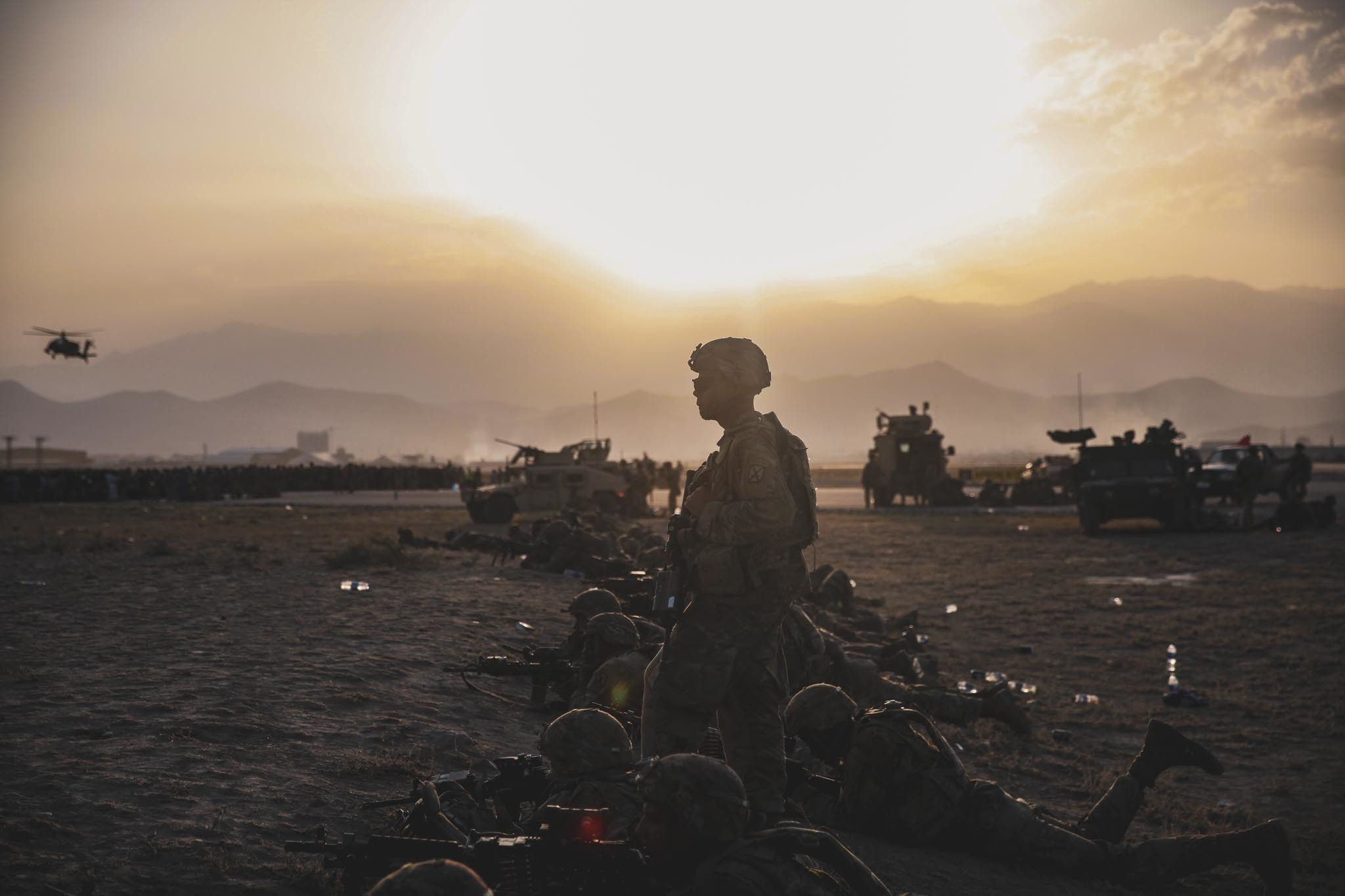
US Army 10th Mountain Division soldiers guarding the apron at Kabul Airport. Crowds of people can be seen in the background.

Panic spread among the civilian population as the Taliban seized the capital, with many citizens rushing to their homes or to the airport, which remained under NATO control after the Afghan government dissolved. A chaotic situation developed as thousands of fleeing Afghan civilians rushed to Kabul Airport, with hundreds crowding the apron in an attempt to catch flights out of the city; some had climbed over boundary walls to enter the airport. US soldiers hovered helicopters low overhead as crowd control, deployed smoke grenades, and occasionally fired warning shots into the air to disperse people attempting to forcefully board aircraft. Video footage emerged showing hundreds of people running alongside a moving United States Air Force C-17A transport plane taxiing toward the runway; some people could be seen clinging onto the aircraft, just below the wing. Others were running alongside "waving and shouting". At least two people, in an apparent attempt to stowaway, were reportedly shown to "fall from the undercarriage immediately after takeoff". Another body was later found in the landing gear of the C-17. One of the victims was identified as Zaki Anwari, who had played for Afghanistan's national youth football team. Three bodies, including that of a woman, were also found on the ground outside near the passenger terminal building, but their cause of death was unclear, though some observers speculated they may have died during a stampede. Seven people were eventually confirmed to have died during this stage—including two armed men shot after firing at US soldiers, according to the US Department of Defense (DOD). The soldiers were not injured, and the gunmen were not identified.

At least 22 Afghan Air Force planes and 24 helicopters carrying 585 Afghan military personnel and their relatives had fled to Uzbekistan. One Afghan Embraer EMB 314 Super Tucano crashed after crossing the border, with Uzbek authorities issuing conflicting reports on the cause. Two Afghan military planes carrying over 100 soldiers also landed in the Tajikistan city of Bokhtar.

About 8:30 p.m. local time, reports emerged that the US embassy was taking fire. The embassy issued a declaration instructing US citizens in the area to shelter in place. Secretary of State Antony Blinken announced that the embassy would be relocated to the airport as the DOD had taken over security and air traffic control there. Various other nations had announced plans to evacuate their embassies, including Spain, Germany, the United Kingdom, the Netherlands, and Denmark. The German government announced that it was sending A400M Atlas aircraft with a contingent of paratroopers for evacuations, adding it would not seek the required parliamentary approval for the operation until after the mission was complete. The Italian government was reported to have transferred its embassy staff as well as the families of 30 Afghan employees to Kabul airport under Carabinieri guard to prepare for evacuation. India was reported to have had C-17 transport planes prepared to evacuate Indian diplomatic staff, but had anticipated that it would take longer for the Taliban to capture Kabul. One group of Indian diplomats were escorted to the airport by the Taliban after negotiating the escort after having had their passage out of the Indian embassy blocked several times by the group. Albania said it had accepted a US request to serve as a transit hub for evacuees.

The Philippine government ordered the mandatory evacuation of Filipino nationals in Afghanistan through the auspices of the Department of Foreign Affairs and the Philippines Embassy in Islamabad, Pakistan (which is accredited to Afghanistan). Of the 173 Filipino nationals there, 78 agreed to accept the government's repatriation efforts while some accepted help from their companies. The Philippine government also agreed to accept refugees from Afghanistan.

A flight by the airline Emirates to Kabul was diverted and later returned to Dubai, and United Arab Emirates airline Flydubai announced that it would suspend flights to Kabul on 16 August. By 16 August, most other airlines had also announced suspension of flights to Kabul. The Afghanistan Civil Aviation Authority announced that it had released Kabul airspace to the military and warned that "any transit through Kabul airspace will be uncontrolled".

The US Department of Defense confirmed on 16 August that General Kenneth F. McKenzie Jr., commander of United States Central Command, had met with Taliban leaders in Qatar to secure an agreement. The Taliban reportedly agreed to allow American evacuation flights at Kabul Airport to proceed without hindrance. International airlifts of evacuees had resumed by 17 August following a temporary halt to clear the runway of civilians as the US military confirmed the airport was open for all military flights and limited commercial flights. Pentagon officials added that evacuation efforts were expected to be expedited and were scheduled to continue until 31 August.

Al Jazeera, relaying tracking of flight data posts on Twitter, said that between 15 and 16 August, at least 170 military flights flew from countries including the United States (128); the United Kingdom (12); France (6); Canada (5); Germany (4); Italy (3); Australia (3); India (2); Austria (1); Belgium (1); Denmark (1); Netherlands (1); Sweden (1); Spain (1); and Turkey (1).

A photograph of over 800 refugees packed into an American C-17 taking off from Kabul was widely shared on social media. French newspaper Le Monde stated that the photo had become "a symbol of the escape from the Taliban". Another video went viral on 17 August, where a man attempting to escape the country recorded himself and others clinging onto a C-17 military aircraft. A photograph of a US soldier clutching the furled US embassy flag during the evacuations emerged and was circulated by media outlets.

=== 17–21 August ===
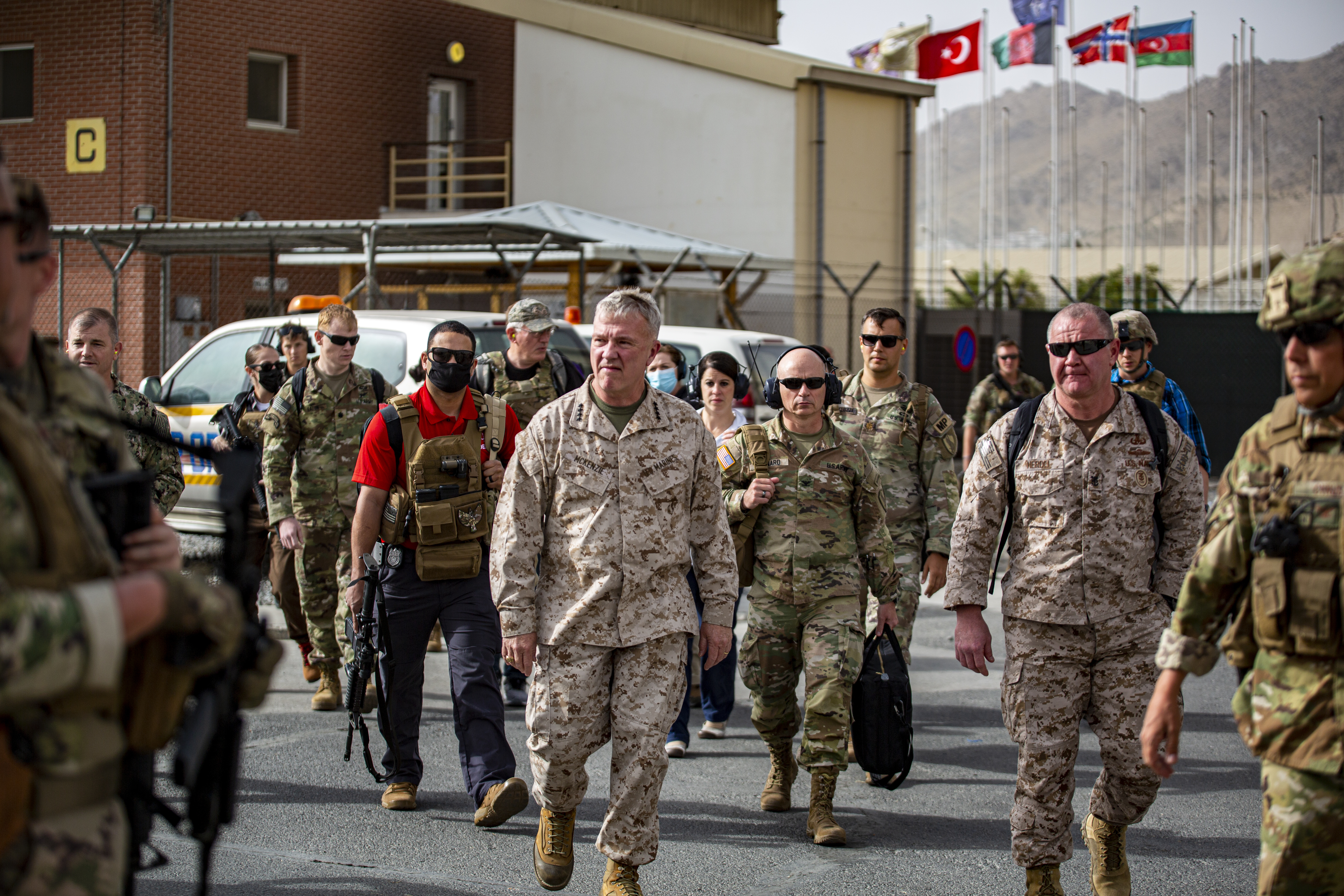
General Kenneth F. McKenzie Jr. (center), commander of United States Central Command, at Kabul Airport on 17 August 2021

On 17 August, the United States Department of State and National Security Advisor Jake Sullivan challenged reports of Afghans and Americans being unable to reach the airport. Sullivan told reporters that the Taliban were prepared to "provide the safe passage of civilians to the airport, and we intend to hold them to that commitment" while affirming that the withdrawal deadline remained 31 August. Sullivan acknowledged reports of the Taliban physically preventing people from evacuating, but said "By and large, what we have found is that people have been able to get to the airport."

On 18 August, it was reported that an Afghan interpreter who had worked for the Australian military had been shot in the leg by the Taliban as he crossed a checkpoint leading to the airport. That same day, it was further reported that the first Australian evacuation flight had departed the airport with only 26 people on board, despite having capacity for over 120. The first German evacuation flight the day prior had also transported a low number of evacuees, taking off with only 7 on board. The Malaysian High Commission in India (which is accredited to Afghanistan) confirmed it had helped a Malaysian citizen return home earlier in the month. It also confirmed that two other Malaysian nationals working for an international relief organisation had opted to remain in Kabul. The High Commission urged remaining Malaysian citizens to register with them for repatriation.

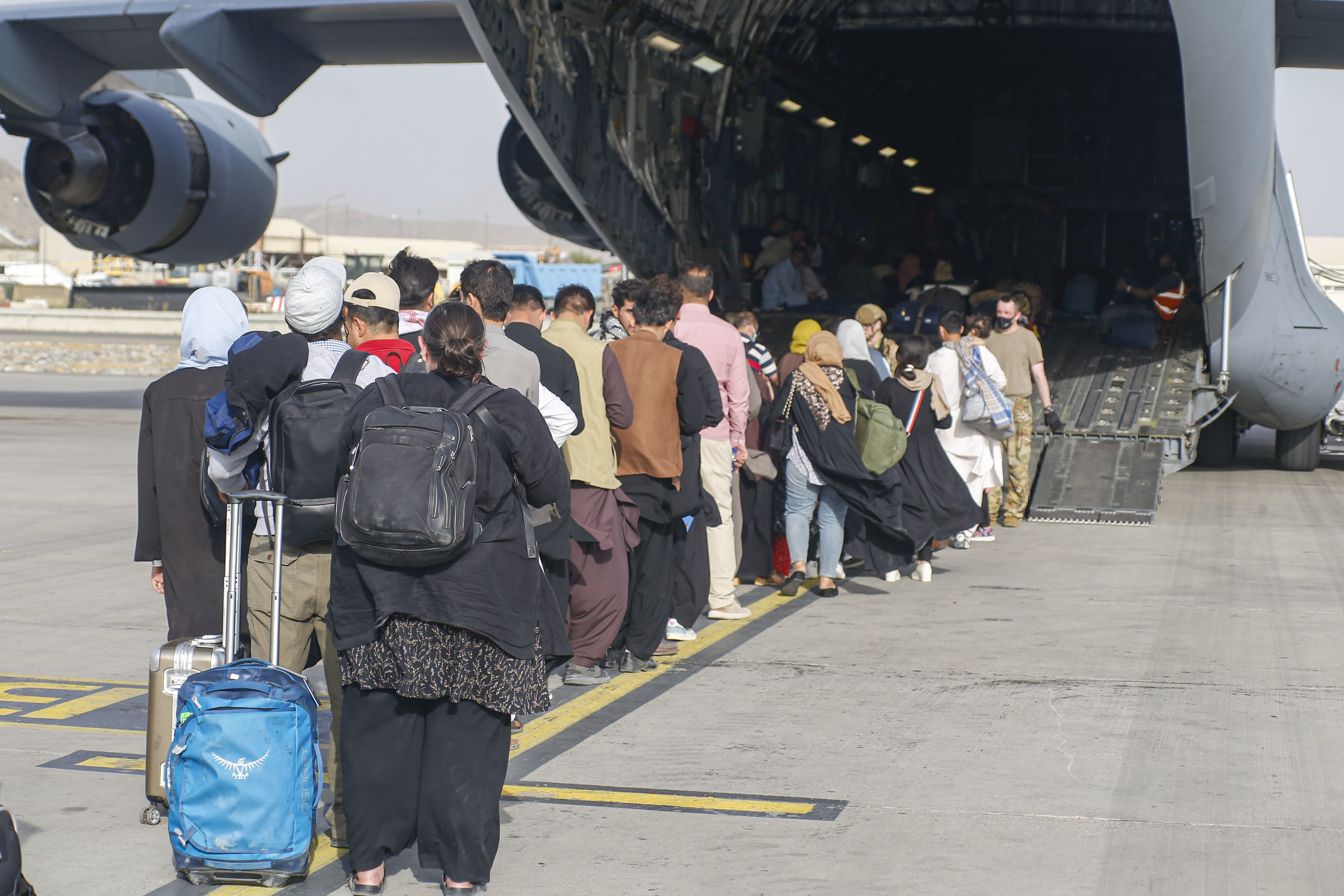
Evacuees boarding a C-17 Globemaster III at Hamid Karzai International Airport, 18 August

On 19 August, UK Defence Secretary Ben Wallace stated that the evacuation flights could not take unaccompanied children after a number of videos posted to social media showed desperate families attempting to convince NATO soldiers to take their children to safety. The Guardian reported that the British government had informed the 125 Afghan guards who had been guarding the British embassy in Kabul that they would not be offered asylum in the UK because they were hired by the private security firm GardaWorld. In contrast, GardaWorld guards of the US embassy had already been evacuated. That evening, the Finnish government announced it was preparing to send troops to the airport to assist in the evacuations, with around 60 Finnish citizens still stuck in Kabul. French newspaper Libération obtained a confidential United Nations report that found the Taliban had priority lists of individuals to arrest and were also targeting the families of people who had worked with the Afghan government and NATO.

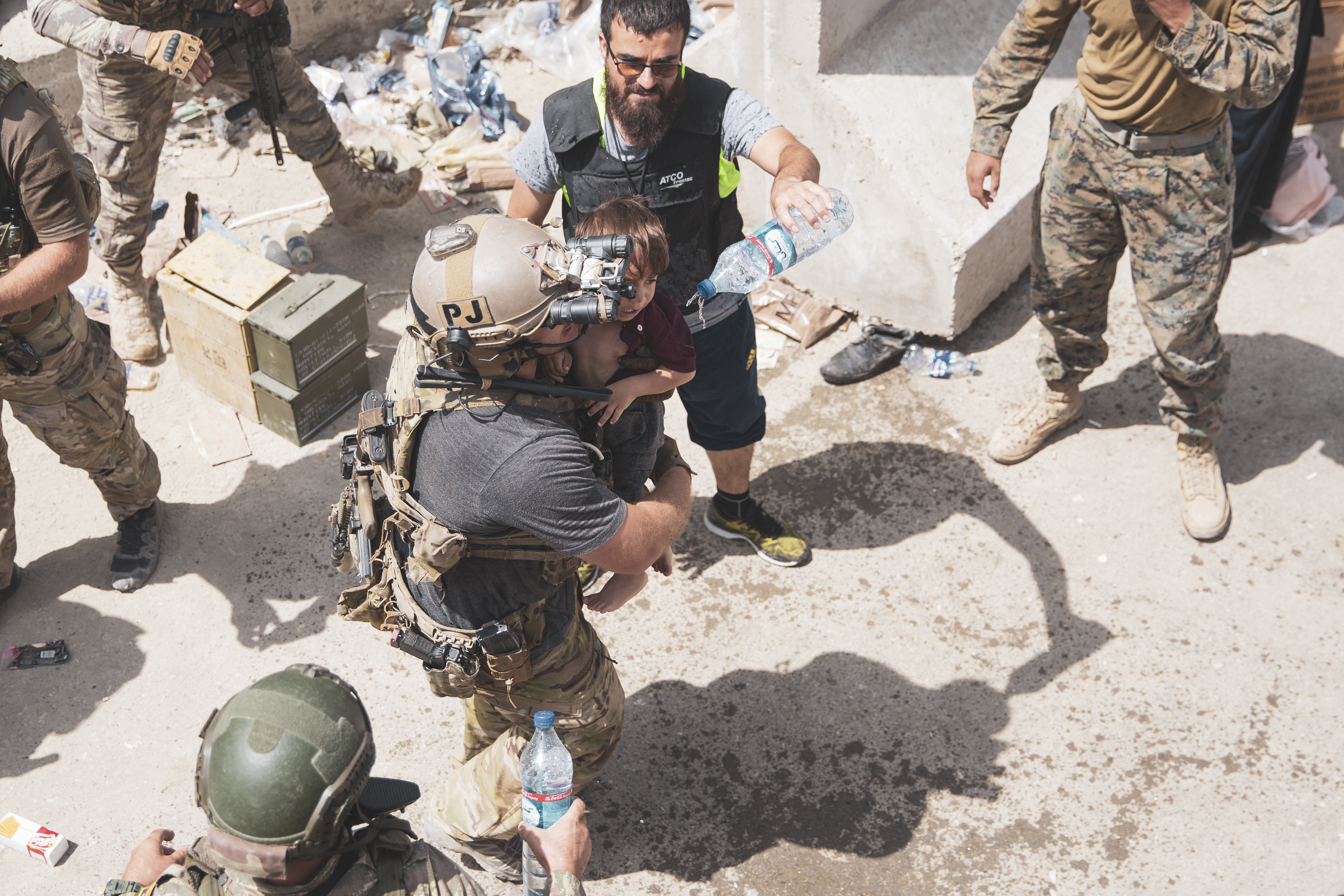
USAF Pararescueman carries a child at an Evacuation Control Checkpoint. Aug. 20.

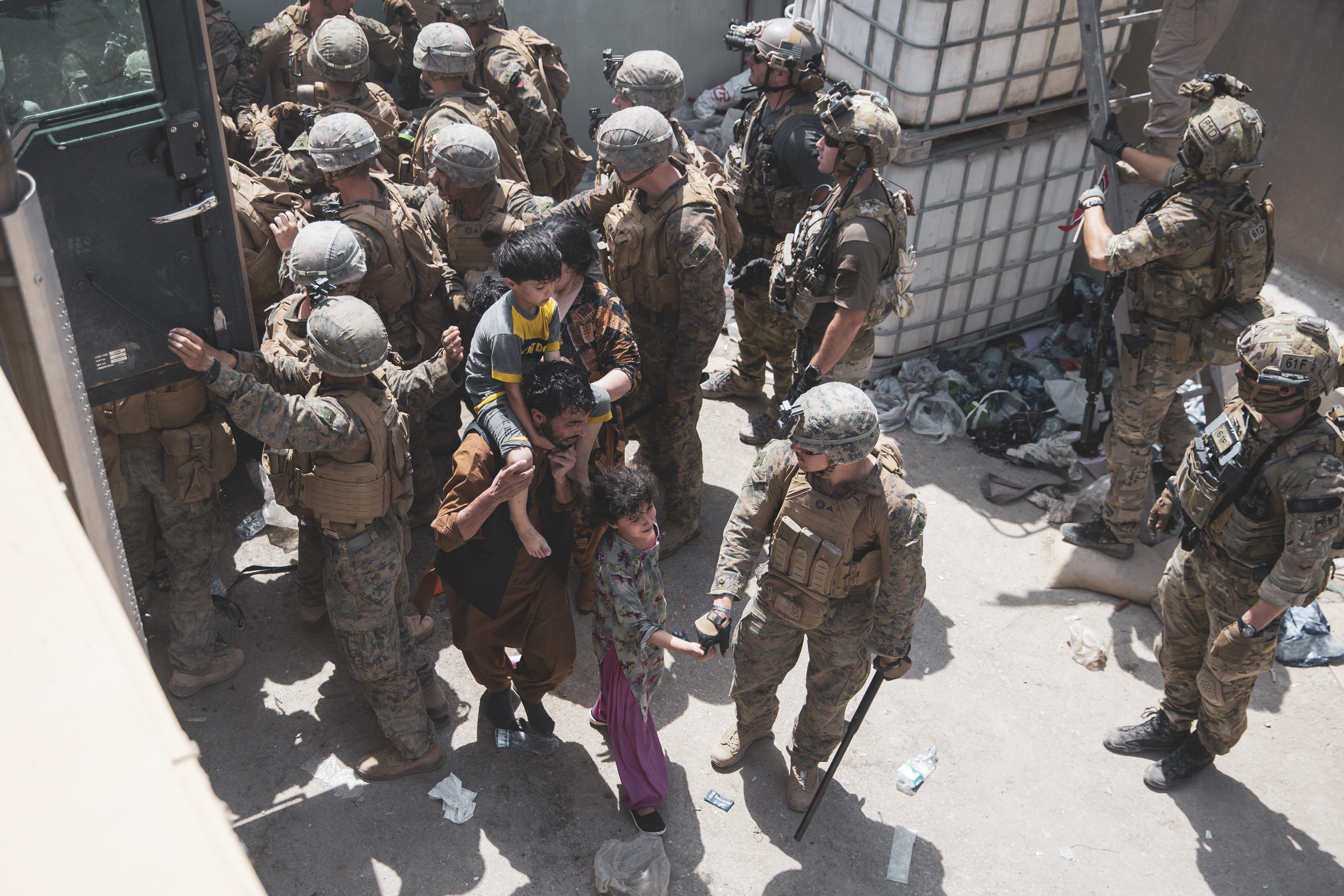
US 1st Battalion, 8th Marines and Norwegian soldiers processing evacuees at Kabul airport, 20 August

By 20 August, it was reported that French special forces had rescued 400 civilians from Kabul, including French nationals and Afghan citizens that had aided French forces during the war. British special forces were also reportedly active during the evacuation. On 20 August, it was reported that the National Directorate of Security's 01 Unit was working alongside NATO forces in the airlift as its members refused to surrender to the Taliban. They were scheduled to be airlifted once American troops withdraw.

On 21 August, Reuters reported that the World Bank's Kabul-based staff and their immediate families were safely evacuated among 350 people aboard a special Pakistan International Airlines flight to Islamabad. The Indian Express reported that the Taliban had blocked 72 Afghan Sikhs and Hindus from boarding an Indian Air Force evacuation flight. Kim Sengupta of The Independent reported that at least four women were crushed to death in a rush on a narrow road leading to the airport. By the afternoon, the US government was advising American citizens not to travel to the airport because of potential risks. On the same day, Indonesia evacuated 26 of its nationals, along with five Filipinos and two Afghan nationals using the Indonesian Air Force Boeing 737-400 with a number of soldiers of the Koopssus TNI.

=== 22 August ===
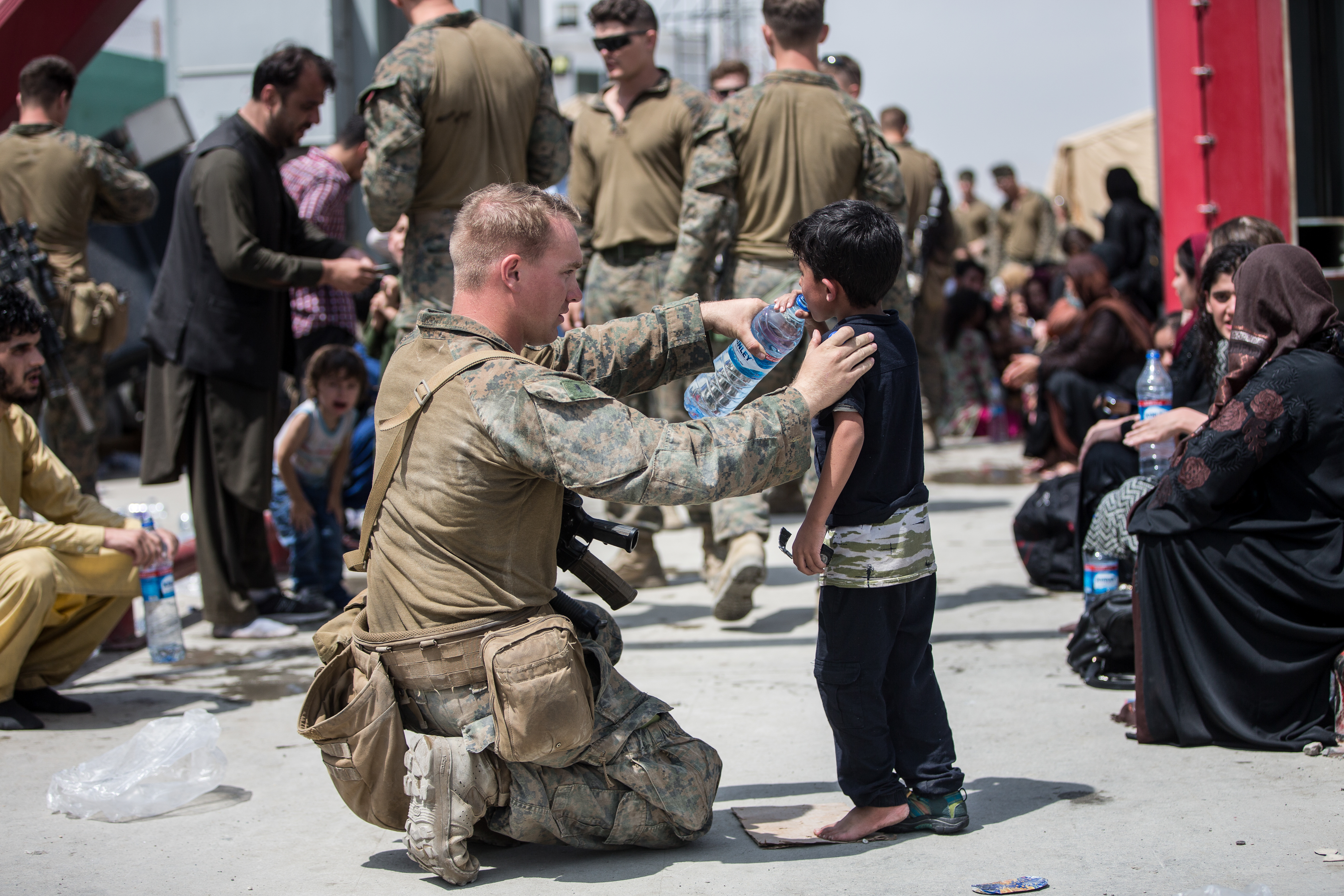
US Marine provides fresh water to a child at Kabul Airport

On 22 August, the Australian Broadcasting Corporation revealed that the Australian government had denied visas to over 100 Afghans who had worked as security guards for the Australian embassy. That evening, Lloyd Austin, United States Secretary of Defense, ordered the activation of the American Civil Reserve Air Fleet to aid in the evacuations, only the third time in history that the fleet had been activated. By the end of the day, at least 28,000 people had been officially evacuated from Kabul and 13 countries had agreed to temporarily host Afghan refugees awaiting clearance for resettlement in the US, but tens of thousands more foreign nationals and at-risk Afghans remained stuck in Kabul. Also on 22 August, the Dutch defence ministry announced that it was deploying more troops to Afghanistan to assist the 62 Dutch special forces personnel at Kabul Airport, where they were operating two C-130 military planes for evacuations. According to Defence Minister Sigrid Kaag, over 700 Dutch citizens in Afghanistan were still waiting to be evacuated, adding that at-risk Afghans that managed to be evacuated could be eligible for asylum. The Dutch embassy's 207 staffers and their families had evacuated to the Netherlands days prior.

According to Der Spiegel, on the night of 22 August, nine German KSK special forces operators code named "Blue Light" rescued a Munich family of three from a rendezvous point at a gate outside of Kabul Airport. The family had previously contacted Germany's Federal Foreign Office after several failed attempts to enter the north gate at the airport, but the office initially rejected the mother's evacuation due to her not being a German citizen, before reversing its decision.

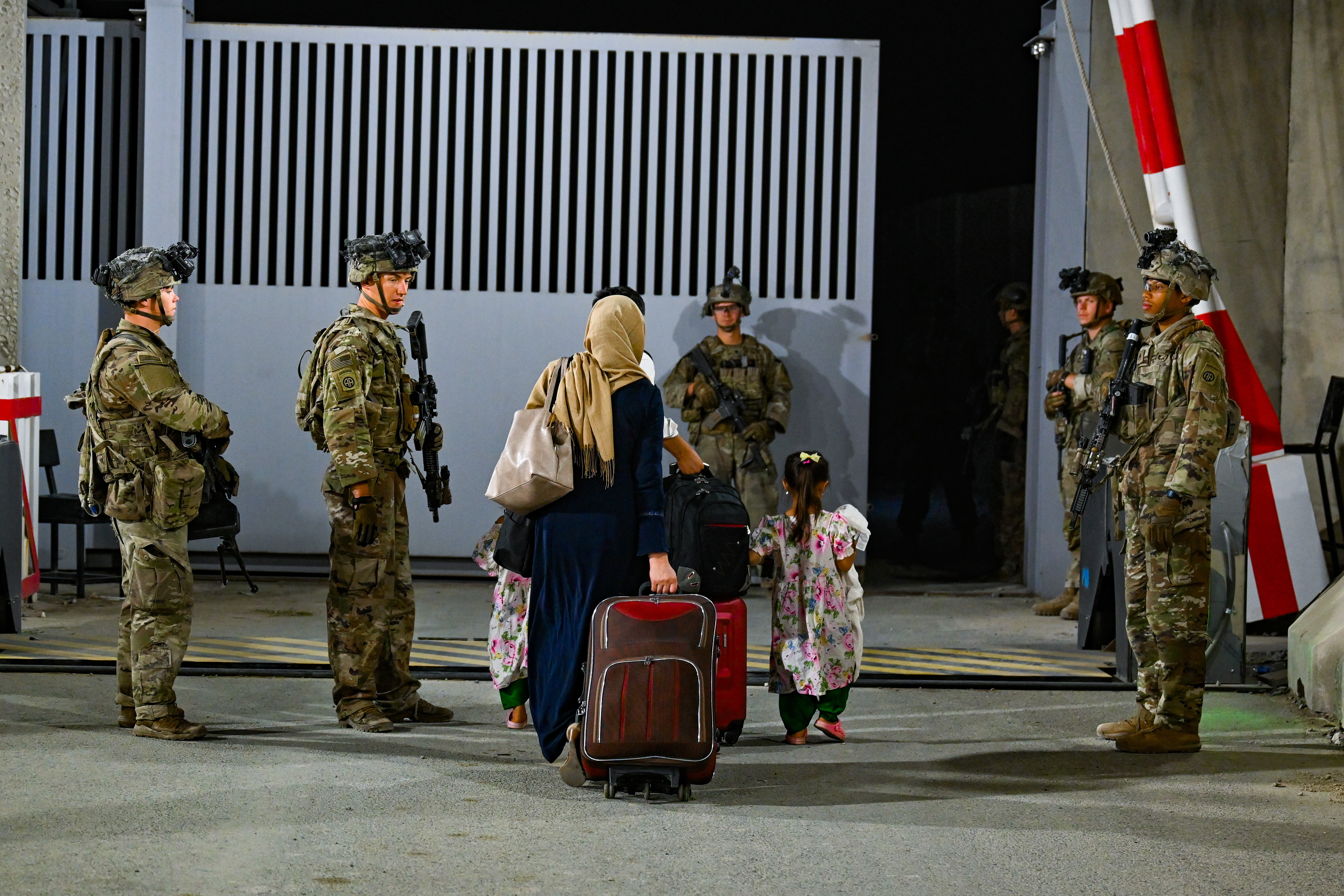
US paratroopers of the 1st Brigade Combat Team, 82nd Airborne Division and evacuees at Kabul Airport, 22 August

Over a few days in August, the Royal Australian Air Force completed five evacuation flights, with the Royal New Zealand Air Force (RNZAF) completing another before 23 August.

=== 23 August ===
On 23 August, the British government stated that it would not continue evacuations after American forces withdrew from the airport; however, the government would be asking the Americans not to withdraw at the end of the month in an emergency G7 meeting. The Taliban indicated that they would be unwilling to extend the 31 August deadline for American withdrawal. Around 7 a.m. local time, one Afghan guard was killed and three wounded in a firefight between Afghan, American, and German troops and unidentified attackers. Ireland approved the deployment of a small special forces team from the Army Ranger Wing and Irish diplomats to Kabul Airport in order to evacuate Irish citizens. The Canadian government officially confirmed that Canadian special forces had launched operations outside of the airport to help evacuate people. US president Biden said that thus far the Taliban had kept their promises and had not taken any action against US forces controlling Kabul Airport. Meanwhile, CIA Director William Burns held a secret meeting in Kabul with Taliban leader Abdul Ghani Baradar, who had returned to Afghanistan from exile in Qatar to discuss the 31 August withdrawal deadline.

Also on 23 August, Gulf News reported that since 14 August, Pakistan International Airlines (PIA) evacuated 1,400 people from Kabul which included diplomats, foreign media and Afghan journalists and staff of international organizations. European Union (EU) and Asian Development Bank (ADB) also requested Pakistani authorities to help evacuate their employees and their families in Afghanistan. EU officials sought urgent evacuation of at least 420 people while ADB requested evacuation of 290 people. By this time PIA was the only commercial airline that was still operating flights to and from Kabul.

=== 24 August ===
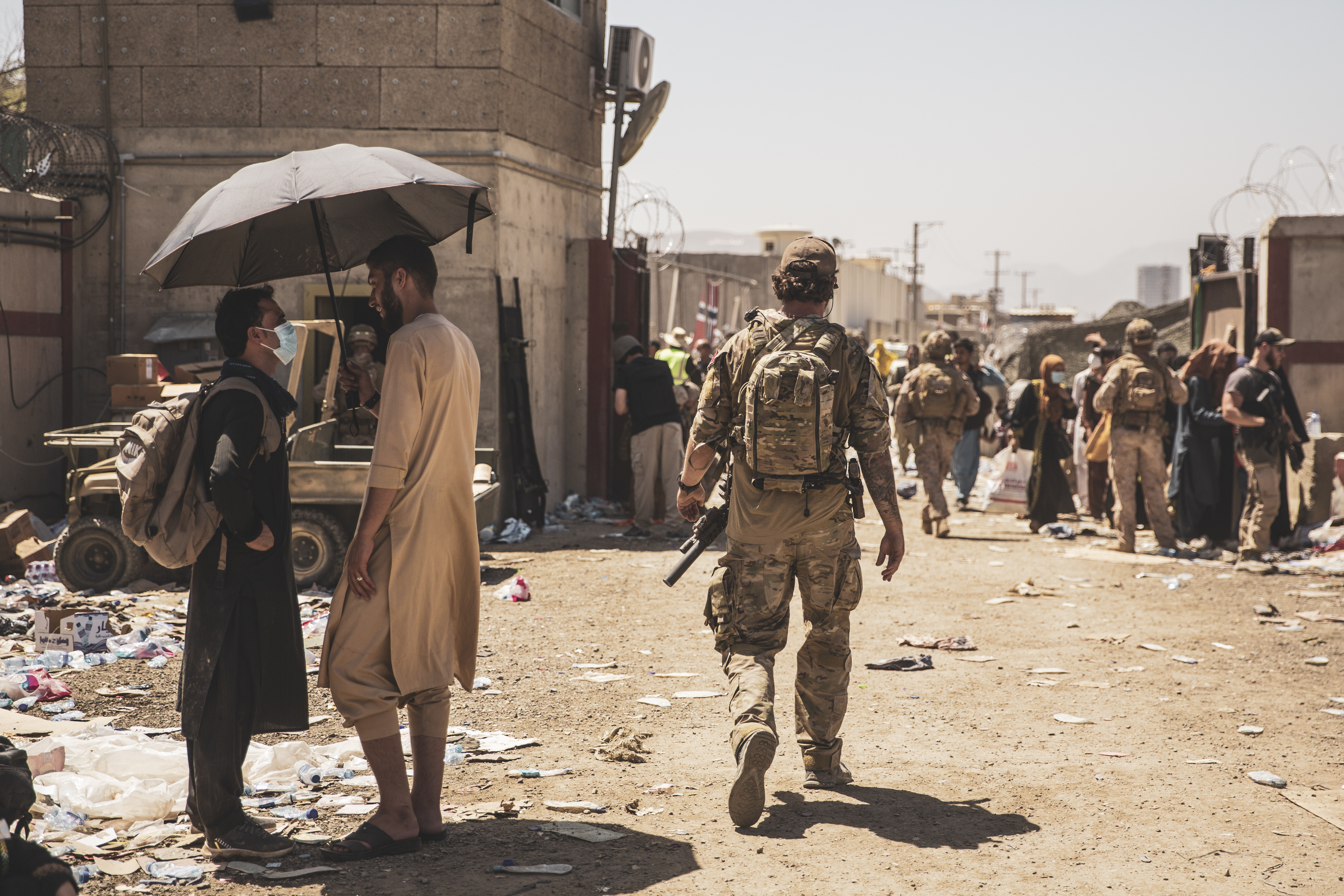
Canadian soldier walks through an evacuation checkpoint at Kabul Airport, 24 August. Canada evacuated at least 3,700 people during Operation AEGIS.

The US Department of Defense reported that 21,600 people had been evacuated from Kabul Airport in the preceding 24 hours, reflecting a significant increase in the speed of evacuations ahead of the 31 August withdrawal deadline. The total number of persons evacuated from Afghanistan via the airport in the preceding ten days was 70,700. Several hundred US military personnel in support roles who were deemed nonessential had withdrawn in the preceding days, while 5,800 US Army soldiers and US Marines remained to guard the airport. Among the US forces protecting the airport was the 82nd Airborne Division headquarters element; 1st Brigade Combat Team, 82nd Airborne Division; 2nd Battalion, 1st Marines; 1st Battalion, 8th Marines; 4th Battalion, 31st Infantry Regiment, 10th Mountain Division; 2nd Battalion, 30th Infantry Regiment, 10th Mountain Division; HHB, 1st Battalion, 101st Field Artillery Regiment, Massachusetts Army National Guard and 1st Combined Arms Battalion, 194th Armor Regiment, Minnesota Army National Guard; 23d Military Police Company, 91st Military Police Battalion, 16th Military Police Brigade.

By 24 August, six Fijian United Nations workers had been evacuated with the assistance of Australian forces. South Korea airlifted 380 Afghans who had "worked at the Korean Embassy or hospitals and job training centers run by Korean engineering and reconstruction forces."

On 24 August, Yevhen Yenin, the Ukrainian deputy minister for foreign affairs, claimed that an evacuation flight had been hijacked and flown to Iran; however, both the Iranian and Ukrainian governments denied that such an event had occurred. That day, two American congressmen, Seth Moulton and Peter Meijer, attracted criticism after flying into Kabul on a military charter plane and staying in the airport for a few hours on an alleged fact-finding mission before flying back out on another charter plane.

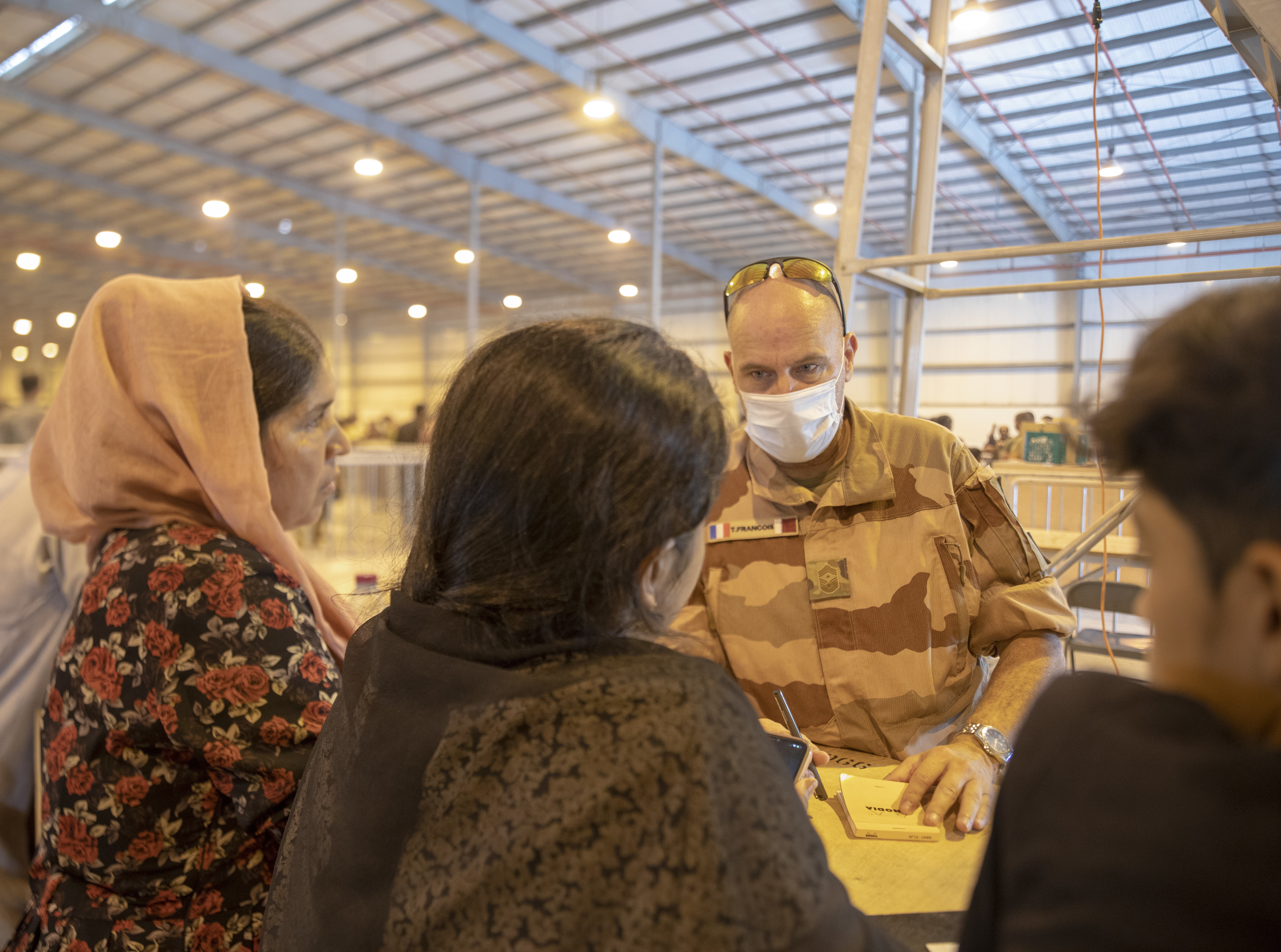
French soldier speaks with evacuees at Al Udeid Air Base in Qatar, 25 August 2021. The French Armed Forces launched Opération Apagan on 15 August to airlift Afghan evacuees, concluding on 27 August.

=== 25 August ===
On 25 August, a Japan Air Self-Defence Force C-2 transport plane arrived at Kabul International Airport and brought in Self-Defense Force personnel and supplies, but returned to their base of operations in Islamabad on the same day because the Japanese nationals to be transported had not arrived at the airport.

=== 26 August ===
On 26 August, it was reported that US officials in Kabul gave the Taliban a list of names of American citizens, green card holders, and Afghan allies to grant entry into the airport for evacuation. President Biden stated that the "bulk of the group" had been allowed into the airport by the Taliban, but he could not say with "certitude" whether there was a list of names passed to the Taliban. Meanwhile, Canada announced that it was ending its Afghanistan evacuation mission, leaving unknown numbers of Canadian and Afghan allies stranded. Australia, Belgium, the Czech Republic, Denmark, Germany, Hungary, the Netherlands, New Zealand, and Poland also announced the end of their evacuations on this day.

Also on 26 August, the first evacuation convoy of 225 Turkish soldiers and 120 Azerbaijani soldiers returned to Turkey. And it was announced that 1,129 civilians were evacuated in total. A further 12,500 people were evacuated from Afghanistan in general.

==== Abbey Gate suicide attack ====
On 26 August, an explosion occurred outside the Abbey Gate of Hamid Karzai International Airport. The Islamic State of Iraq and the Levant – Khorasan Province (ISIL-K) claimed responsibility for the attack. ISIL-K is a sworn enemy of both the United States and the Taliban. The attack was perpetrated by a suicide bomber, who detonated a 25-pound explosive vest hidden under clothing, close to a group of US military personnel who were performing security screenings of Afghans hoping to enter the airport.

According to local health officials, at least 170 people were killed, and another 150 others were wounded in the attack. The bombing was carried out at the airport gate. The majority of those killed were Afghan civilians, but 13 US military personnel (11 Marines, one Army soldier, and one Navy corpsman) and 2 British nationals were also among the dead. A Taliban official said that 28 Taliban members were killed in the attack, but a Taliban spokesman later denied that any of their fighters had been killed. The wounded included many Afghans and 18 American troops. The wounded Americans were medically evacuated to Landstuhl Regional Medical Center near Ramstein Air Base, Germany.

The bombing disrupted evacuation efforts, although flights resumed soon afterward. General Frank McKenzie, the head of US Central Command, indicated that US officials were on alert for possible future ISIL-K attacks against the airport, possibly through rockets or car bombs; McKenzie said intelligence was being shared with the Taliban and "some attacks have been thwarted by" the Taliban.

After the airport attack, the US carried out a drone strike on an ISIL-K planner in Jalalabad, eastern Nangarhar province. The US Department of Defense reported that the airstrike killed the target and caused no civilian casualties.

=== 27 August ===
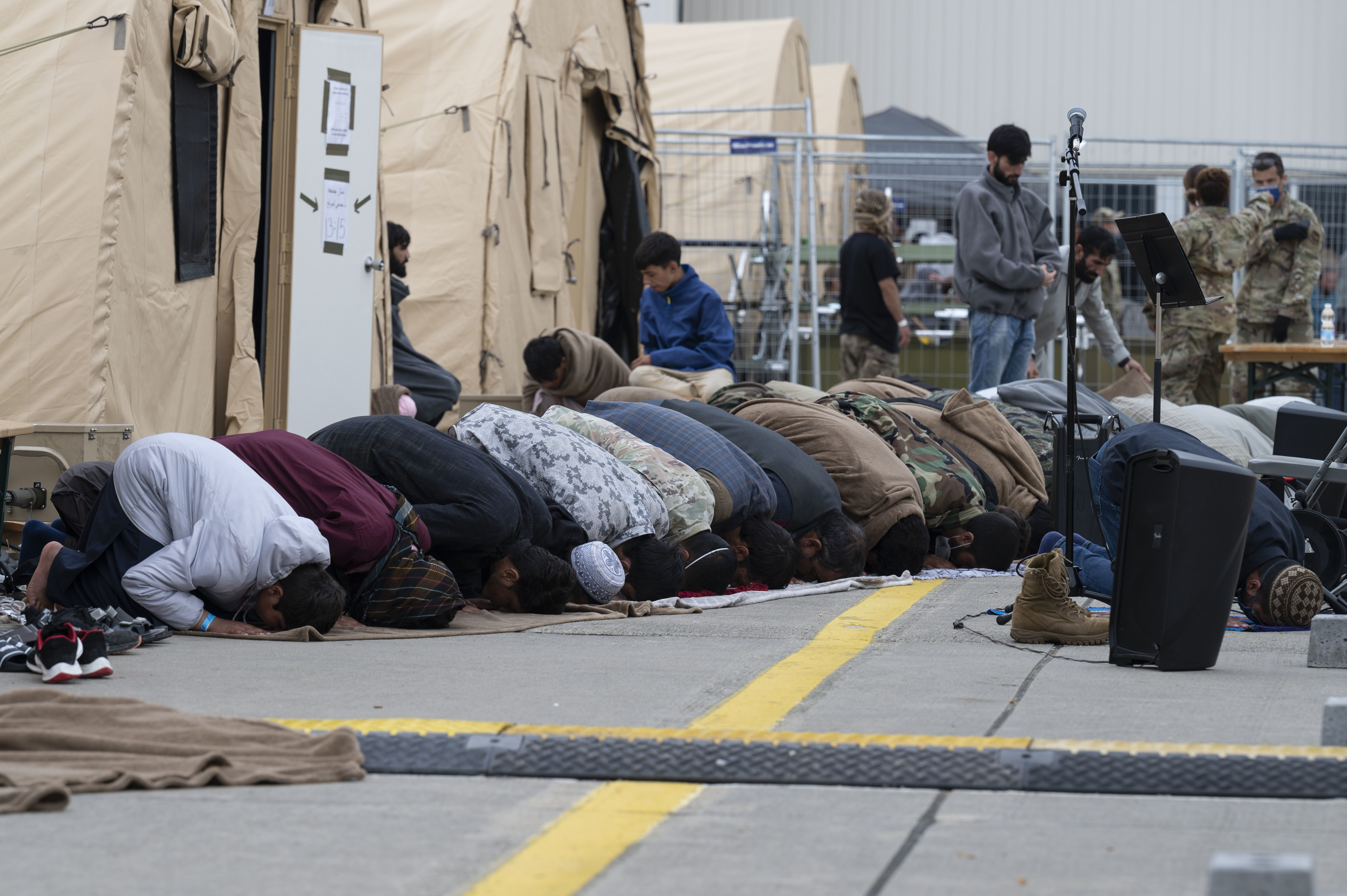
Afghan evacuees bow during noon congregational prayer at Ramstein Air Base in Germany on 27 August 2021

On 27 August, Australia, France, Italy, New Zealand, Norway, Spain, Sweden, and Switzerland announced the end of their evacuation flights. In total, France evacuated 3,000 people, including 2,600 Afghans during their "Operation Apagan". The last Italian Air Force flight completed the evacuation of 5,011 people, 4,890 of whom were Afghan citizens.

On 27 August 120 Azerbaijani soldiers landed in Baku from Turkey. The second convoy of Turkish soldiers landed in Ankara, and Turkey announced that all Turkish military evacuations had been completed.

In the evening, JASDF C-130 transport planes carrying one Japanese national, 14 Afghan nationals at the behest of the United States and all Self-Defense Forces personnel took off from Kabul International Airport, arriving at Islamabad on the same night. All Japanese nationals who wished to evacuate had been evacuated, but many local embassy employees who wished to evacuate were left behind. The Japanese evacuation was completed.

=== 28 August ===
On 28 August, the United Kingdom concluded its evacuation of British civilians. At the peak of UK evacuation efforts, more than 1,000 British troops were in Kabul; by 28 August, some had already left. The British government later confirmed that all British soldiers, diplomats and other officials had left Afghanistan by the following day.

The same day, it was reported that the Taliban and Turkey had reached a draft agreement allowing Turkey to operate Kabul Airport after the departure of US forces, for a transitional period. Turkish officials had stated that the country would not help operate the airport unless it can deploy its own security forces to guard it.

=== 29 August ===
On 29 August, the Associated Press reported that the Taliban had sealed off the airport as the US and its allies began concluding the airlift. The Taliban, meanwhile, insisted on taking over the security of Hamid Karzai International Airport themselves instead of Turkey, with spokesperson Zabiullah Mujahid stating that their own special forces would guarantee its safety. However, 98 countries, including the United States, released a joint statement saying that they had received assurances from the Taliban that foreign nationals and Afghans would be allowed to leave the country.

==== Drone strike against Zemari Ahmadi ====
At 16:53, the United States military conducted a drone strike against a suspected ISIS target. A Reaper drone launched a Hellfire missile at the Toyota Corolla of Zemari Ahmadi, an aid worker for California-based Nutrition and Education International, as he was pulling into the driveway of his home and being met by three children running outside to greet him. The strike killed Ahmadi and 9 members of his family, including 7 children and Ahmed Naser – a former translator for the US military.

In the immediate aftermath of the strike, US Central Command stated that the strike had killed an ISIS-K suicide bomber preparing to attack the airport, and that there was a secondary explosion which showed the car had been carrying a "substantial amount of explosive material".

The US military launched an investigation after civilian deaths were reported, and later acknowledged that the strike had been the result of erroneous intelligence, calling it a "tragic mistake". It was found that the drone operators had confused Ahmadi's car with one linked to ISIS-K, that what had been identified as explosives being loaded into the car were actually water bottles, and that a child showed up on the drone's video feed two minutes prior to the strike. The secondary explosion reported was deemed to most likely have been a nearby propane tank detonating.

US officials stated that the strike was an "honest mistake" and that "the investigation found no violation of law, including the law of war", and no disciplinary or legal actions were taken against anybody involvement in the strike, sparking outrage from politicians and human rights organizations.

=== 30 August ===
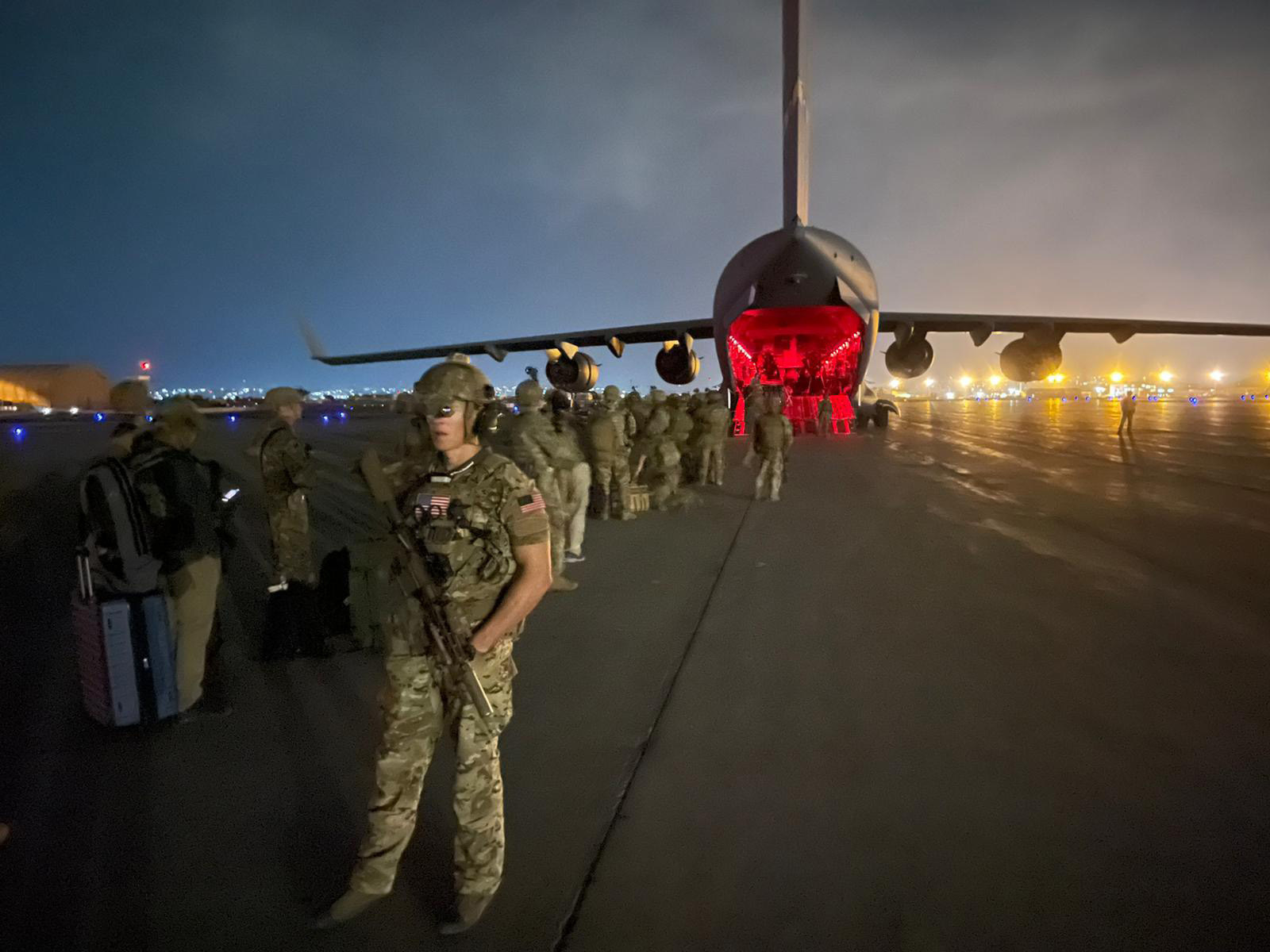
An American Delta Force operator standing guard at Kabul Airport, 30 August 2021

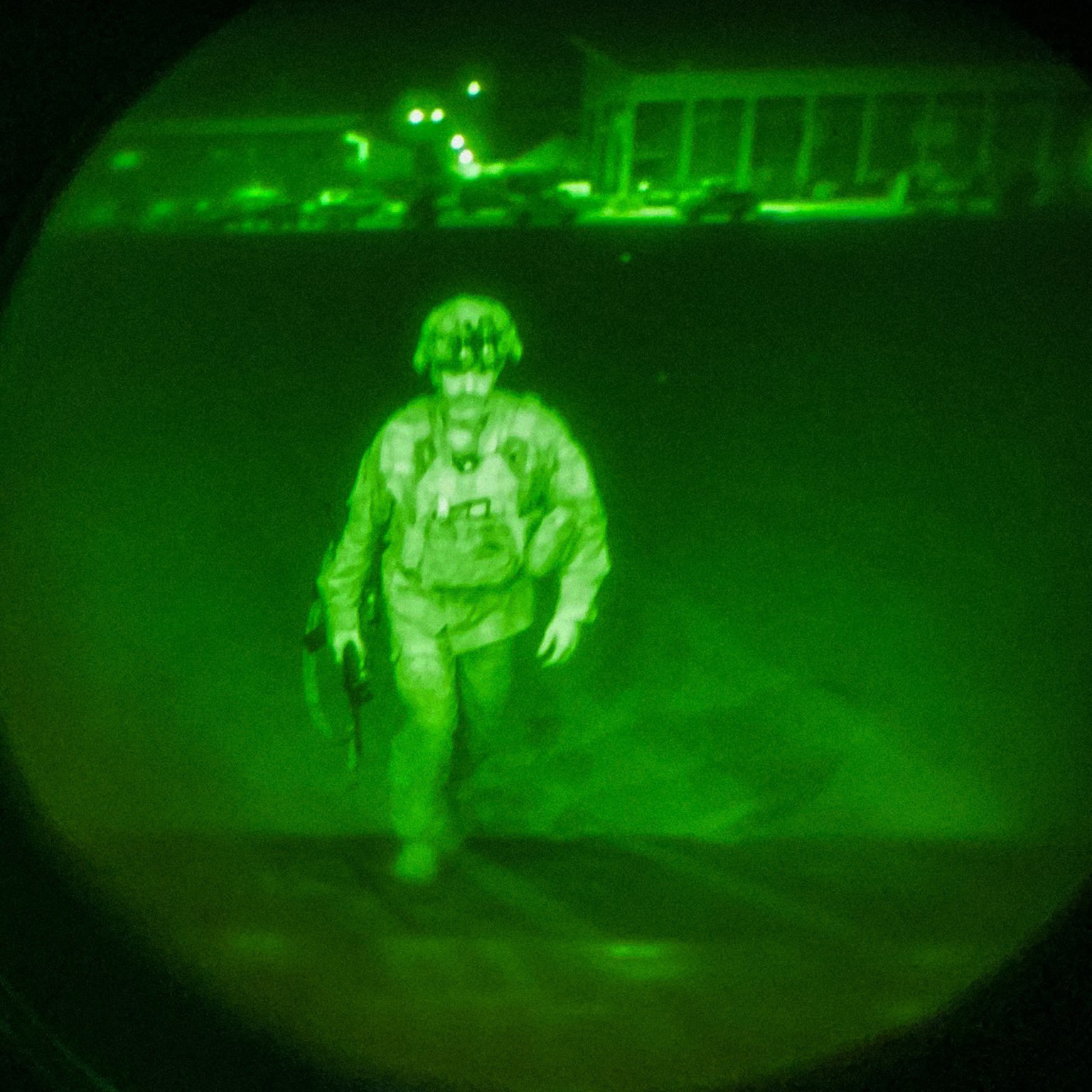
Gen. Chris Donahue boards a C-17 cargo plane at the Kabul airport on the night of 30 August 2021, becoming the final American service member to withdraw from Afghanistan.

A United States official told Reuters that anti-missile defences had intercepted five rockets aimed at the Hamid Karzai International Airport. Pajhwok Afghan News reported that several rockets had struck Kabul. ISIL-K claimed responsibility for the attack.

That morning, the UN Security Council adopted a motion calling on the Taliban to let people freely leave Afghanistan. However, the motion did not include a proposal French President Emmanuel Macron had earlier floated about creating a UN safe zone in Kabul.

Later that evening, General Kenneth F. McKenzie Jr. announced that the United States had completed their evacuation from Afghanistan. Before departing, the American forces used thermite bombs to disable several remaining counter rocket, artillery, and mortar systems they had used to protect the airfield from incoming rockets fired by ISIS-K. In addition, the aircraft and vehicles at the airport were also disabled. The last two Americans to board an evacuation flight were acting Ambassador Ross Wilson, the top US diplomat in Afghanistan, and the final soldier to leave Afghanistan, Major General Chris Donahue, commanding general of the 82nd Airborne Division. The final flight, a US Air Force C-17, departed at 11:59 p.m. (Kabul time) on 30 August. The US phase of the Afghanistan conflict (1978–present), the 2001–2021 chapter that had begun with the 2001 invasion, had concluded.

== Aftermath ==
Afghan refugees resettled per 100K residents after the 2021 Afghan withdrawal and evacuation in each U.S. state and the District of Columbia according to CBS News

In the early hours of 31 August (Kabul time), not long after the final American flight had left, the Taliban marched into the airport, firing their guns into the air in celebration and posing for pictures with abandoned NATO equipment. Taliban leaders, flanked by the Badri 313 Battalion, then entered the airport to hold a press conference declaring that "Afghanistan is finally free" and that they would shortly be announcing a new government.

=== Post–withdrawal evacuations ===
Efforts to evacuate foreign nationals and at-risk Afghans continued after military forces concluded their withdrawals.

On 6 September 2021, the United States evacuated four American citizens (specifically, an Amarillo woman and her three children) from Afghanistan via an overland route, marking the first overland evacuation facilitated by the US Department of State since the military withdrawal. The Taliban was aware of the evacuation and did not make any effort to stop it.

On 9 September 2021, the first flight of foreigners out of Kabul since the US military withdrawal took place. A Qatar Airways charter flight left the Kabul airport en route to Doha, Qatar, carrying some 200 passengers, including Americans. A second such flight was scheduled for the following day.

On 11 October 2021, Aman Khalili, an Afghan interpreter who in 2008 had rescued then-Senators Joe Biden, Chuck Hagel, and John Kerry, was rescued along with his family. At the time Khalili's family was rescued by the Human First Coalition and the U.S. State Department, they were in Pakistan, having already left Afghanistan.

The UK Government's Afghan Citizens Resettlement Scheme to help Afghans fleeing the Taliban settle in the UK, which was announced in August 2021, opened in January 2022.

By 26 October 2021, the U.S. government reported 363 known American citizens remained in Afghanistan with only 176 wanting to leave. Evacuation figures included 240 people via government-sponsored transport and 74 via private flights. These totals were mirrored by the number of U.S. permanent residents evacuated during the same period.

== Evacuation destinations ==
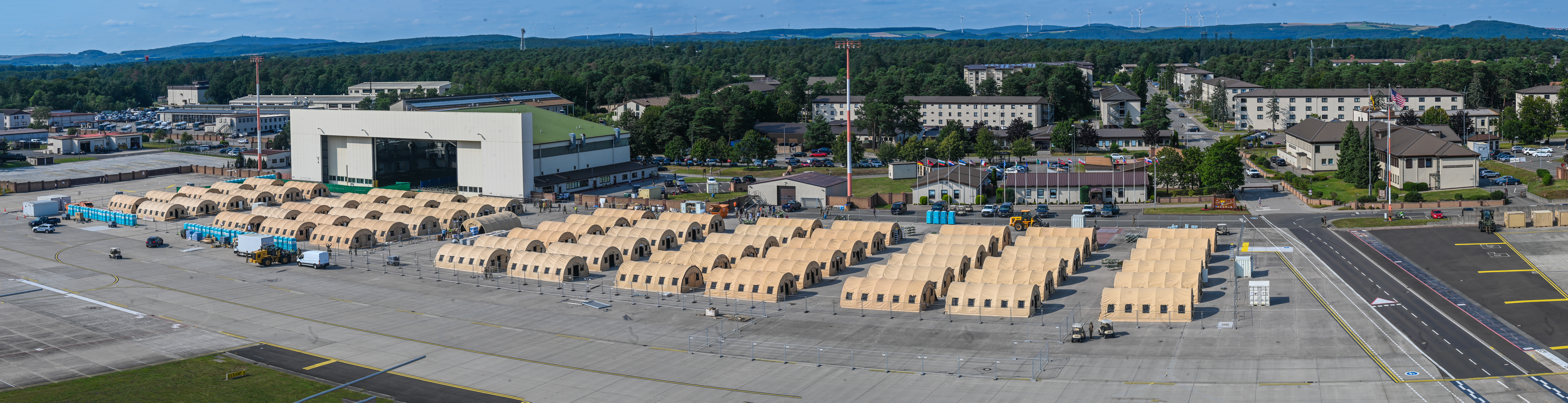
Refugee camp at Ramstein Air Base in Germany

The largest base handling the initial outflow of Afghan evacuees was Al Udeid Air Base outside Doha, Qatar, where evacuees were vetted against the National Counterterrorism Center's terrorist watch list.

The Ramstein Air Base, in Germany, the largest United States Air Force base in Europe, was also a hub for processing Afghan evacuees who had assisted the US and its allies during the Afghan war. About a fifth of all evacuees from Kabul passed through Ramstein. The base has capacity for up to 12,000 evacuees. Evacuees went through medical screenings and were biometrically scanned. At least 30,000 hot meals were served daily; evacuees were housed in aircraft hangars and military tents. By 22 August, about 7,000 people had landed at Ramstein, and about 6,500 remained at the base. Around 700 departed on four flights to the US on 23–24 August, and by 25 August that number increased to around 800. As of 31 August, a total of 11,700 people had been flown from Ramstein to the United States or another safe location.

The USA established temporary housing at military bases in Virginia, Texas, Wisconsin and New Jersey for Afghan refugees. Temporary refugee accommodation was set up at Fort Lee (Virginia), Fort Bliss (Texas), Fort Dix (New Jersey), and Fort McCoy (Wisconsin), with a total capacity for 25,000 people. Fort Lee was the first to receive Operation Allied Refuge evacuees, with 221 arriving at the fort on 30 July. Fort Pickett (Virginia) was also a site for temporary Afghan refugee accommodation.

On 13 August 2021, the Canadian Government announced it would resettle an additional 20,000 vulnerable Afghans such as women leaders, human rights workers and journalists. This was in addition to an earlier initiative to resettle thousands of Afghans who had worked for the Canadian Government, such as interpreters and embassy employees, as well as their families. By March 2022, Canada resettled 8,580 Afghan refugees.

On 17 August 2021, the United Kingdom Government announced a new resettlement programme that aims to resettle 20,000 Afghan refugees over a five-year period in the UK.

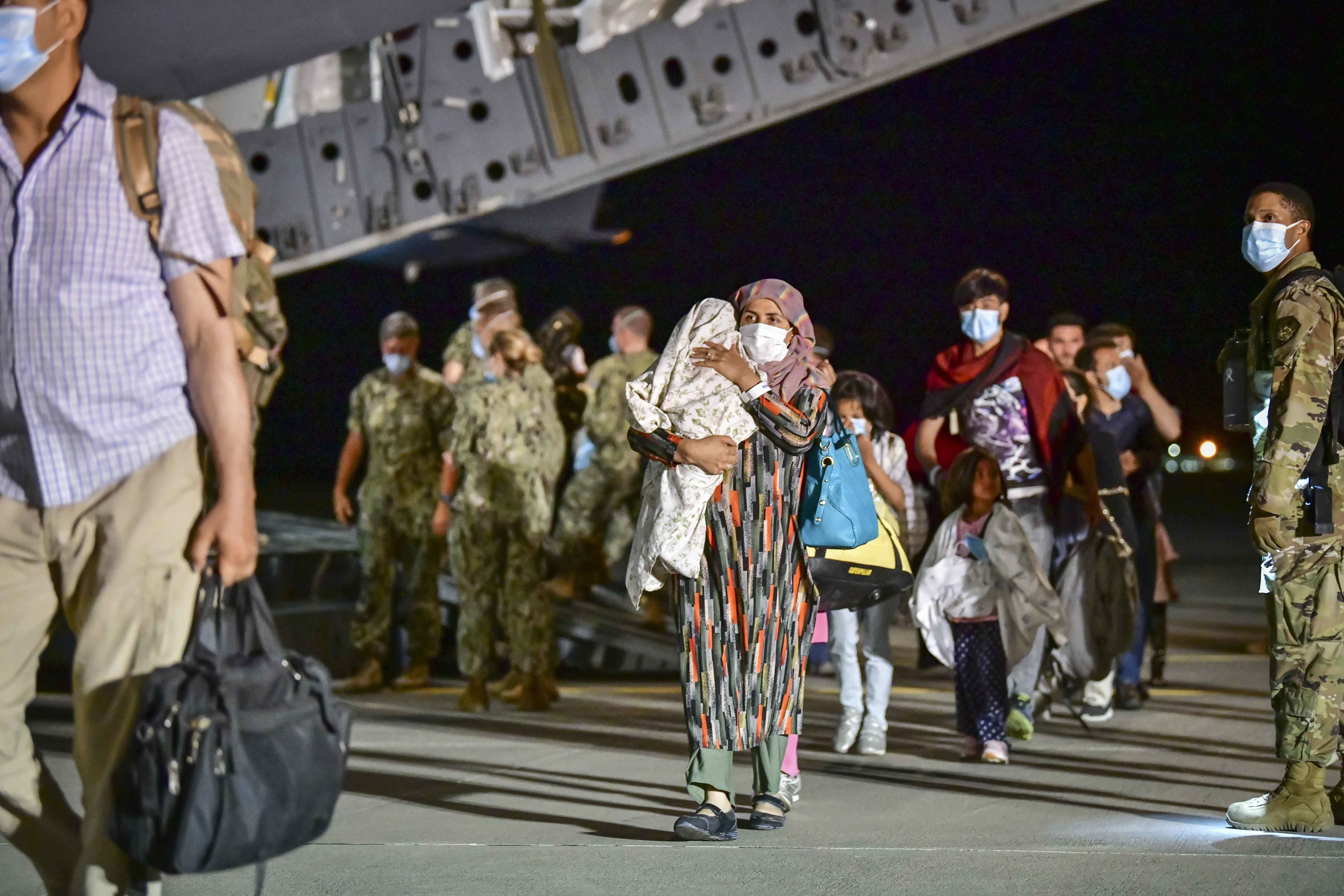
Afghan evacuees arrive at Naval Air Station Sigonella in Sicily, 22 August

On 23 August, the first flight of Afghan evacuees had arrived in New Zealand on a RNZAF Lockheed C-130 Hercules aircraft. By 26 August, the New Zealand Defence Force had evacuated 370 people from Afghanistan, which included an unspecified number of New Zealand, Australian, and Afghan passport holders. By 28 August, the evacuees were transferred to the United Arab Emirates while awaiting travel to New Zealand.

On 11 October, the United Kingdom offered resettlement visas to the Afghan Women's Development Team of football players. The 35 players had fled to Pakistan following the Taliban takeover.

=== Pakistan's role in evacuations ===
As of 27 August, Pakistan has helped to evacuate more than 7,000 foreigners from Afghanistan through air and land routes since the fall of Kabul. By 27 August, more than 113 military and commercial flights have landed in Pakistan. Dawn reported that around 400 special flights carrying Afghan nationals and foreigners from Kabul have departed from and arrived in Islamabad. On 27 August 2021, Pakistan's Interior Minister Sheikh Rasheed announced that the Pakistan government has decided to offer 21 days transit visas to the evacuees.

Danish Prime Minister Mette Frederiksen and Dutch Prime Minister Mark Rutte thanked Pakistan for its support and facilitation in evacuation of stranded people from Afghanistan. Germany's Ambassador to Pakistan Bernhard Schlagheck thanked Pakistani authorities for the cooperation at Islamabad International Airport.

International Monetary Fund's Managing Director Kristalina Georgieva and Asian Development Bank's President Masatsugu Asakawa praised Pakistan's efforts in evacuating the respective financial institution's personnel and their families from Afghanistan. European Council President Charles Michel in a telephonic conversation with Pakistani Prime Minister Imran Khan also thanked him for evacuating European nationals working for different international organisations in Afghanistan. David Beasley, executive director of the UN's World Food Programme (WFP), lauded Pakistan's support for repairing WFP's damaged planes returning from Kabul and establishing a "humanitarian airbridge".

== Reactions ==
Former UK Chief of the General Staff Richard Dannatt stated that the British government had been aware of the need to evacuate vulnerable Afghans for several years and that "it would appear that the government was asleep on watch." The UK Foreign Office group charged with organising the evacuations was revealed to have left over 5000 email messages unread throughout the last week of the evacuations, including many that contained important information of cases of vulnerable Afghans.

The evacuation of Pen Farthing and his Nowzad Dogs charity came under particular scrutiny in the UK. Visas for 68 people, including the staff of the charity and their immediate family members, had originally been granted on 23 August, but Farthing chose not to leave immediately. Permission for the charity's animals (173 dogs and cats) to be airlifted was granted two days later, but they were blocked from entering the airport on 26 August, and then on 27 August, the Afghan staff of the charity were blocked from boarding the evacuation flight. Farthing left Afghanistan along with the animals, but not his staff, on 28 August. Some journalists criticized this prioritizing animals over people as racist, and damaging to Westerners' reputation among local people.

On 28 August, a group of Afghans who had worked as security guards at the Finnish embassy in Kabul organised a protest over being left behind in Afghanistan.

Airbnb announced it would provide free temporary housing for 20,000 Afghan refugees in their destination communities.

== See also ==
- Kabul airlift of 1928–1929 – A large scale evacuation of British and a number European diplomatic staff in Kabul by the Royal Air Force
- Welcome.US – Organization that coordinates support to Afghan refugees in the United States
