= August 2021 Kabul drone strike =

2021 civilian drone killing in Kabul, Afghanistan

- Part of the War in Afghanistan (2001–2021), 2021 Afghanistan attacks, drone strikes in Afghanistan
- U.S. military footage of the drone strike
- Location: Kabul, Afghanistan
- Date: 29 August 2021; 16:53 (UTC+04:30)
- Attack type: Drone strike
- Victims: 10 civilians killed, including 7 children and Zemari Ahmadi
- Perpetrator: United States Central Command (United States Armed Forces)

On 29 August 2021, an unmanned drone attack by the United States killed 10 civilians in Kabul, Afghanistan, including 7 children, with the youngest victim being two-years-old. The U.S. initially said that the vehicle targeted in the strike had visited an Islamic State safe house and that there had been several secondary explosions, implying there had been explosives at the scene. Eyewitnesses and later independent investigations disproved this statement. Three weeks later, the U.S. confirmed that the target of the strike was a Toyota Corolla carrying aid workers and that only civilians had been killed in the strike. No U.S. personnel faced disciplinary action for the attack, which prompted a group of 50 U.S. legislators to call for a review of military practices.

== Background ==
The attack occurred soon after the Fall of Kabul which led to the end of the War in Afghanistan that lasted from 2001 to 2021. In the days after the Fall of Kabul, mass civilian evacuations took place at Hamid Karzai International Airport. During these evacuations, the airport was attacked by a suicide bomber, which killed at least 183 people.

U.S. forces believed that subsequent attacks from ISIS were imminent, and through a series of erroneous intelligence decisions linked a white 1996 Toyota Corolla and its driver, Zemari Ahmadi, to a terrorist plot. In actuality, Ahmadi was a worker for Nutrition and Education International, a California-based aid group.

== Attack and aftermath ==
The day of the attack, Ahmadi ran errands for his employer including picking up a laptop and delivering water. When he stopped at a compound erroneously believed to be an ISIS safe house, six Reaper drones surrounded the compound. At 4:53 PM, a single Hellfire missile was launched, killing 7 children and 3 adults. The attack was conducted by the Over-the-Horizon (OTH) Strike Cell group of the U.S. Central Command.

The United States military initially denied the allegations. Later, with almost everything senior defense officials had asserted in the weeks after the drone strike turning out to be false, the US acknowledged the attack as a mistake after reviewing footage that showed three children coming to greet Ahmadi at his sedan before they were killed.

On 17 September 2021, General Kenneth McKenzie accepted responsibility for the strike, stating that "it was a mistake and I offer my sincere apology".

Brian Castner, the Senior Crisis Advisor with Amnesty International's Crisis Response Programme stated that despite the United States' admission of the drone attack, a full investigation and accountability needed for the victims of the incident.

On 15 October 2021, the Pentagon pledged unspecified amounts of monetary compensation to the families of the victims and to help relocation to the United States. Condolence payments for deaths caused by the American military have varied widely; in fiscal year 2019 the Pentagon offered 71 such payments to victims in Afghanistan and Iraq ranging from $131 to a maximum of $35,000. As of May 2023, the families had not received any compensation beyond relocation to California and a federal refugee cash assistance program of $325 per adult and $200 per child monthly for eight months. Later in November 2021, the Pentagon called the strike as an "honest mistake" and found no violations of war in the attack.

On 13 December 2021, based on the recommendation of McKenzie and General Richard Clark, U.S. Secretary of Defense Lloyd Austin announced that no U.S. personnel would face any disciplinary action as a result of the drone strike, an announcement for which the Pentagon was criticized. U.S. Senator Chris Murphy called the lack of accountability "unacceptable", denouncing the message it sent "all the way through the command structure".

On 14 December, Human Rights Watch stated that the United States's decision to not hold anyone accountable for the strike is a "cause for deep concern" and called the government's response as "problematic".

On 20 January 2022, a group of 50 U.S. legislators submitted a letter to President Joe Biden, calling for a review of military practices, stating that "in too many instances, U.S. drone strikes have instead led to unintended and deadly consequences – killing civilians and increasing anger towards the United States," and describing the August 2021 strike as "emblematic of this systemic failure that has persisted across decades and administrations".

On 27 January 2022, Secretary Austin addressed civilian casualties in drone strikes in a two-page directive in which he asked his department for a plan on the matter within 90 days.

== See also ==
- Kunduz hospital airstrike
- List of massacres in Afghanistan
- United States war crimes
