= Operation Devi Shakti =

Evacuation of Indians from Afghanistan

- Part of 2021 evacuation of Afghanistan and the 2021 Taliban offensive and the War in Afghanistan (2001–2021)
- Operational scope: Humanitarian relief
- Type: Emergency evacuation
- Location: Afghanistan; 34°33′57″N 069°12′47″E
- Planned by: Ministry of External Affairs and Indian Armed Forces
- Objective: Evacuation of Indian nationals, embassy staff and eligible Afghans
- Date: 16 August 2021 – 21 August 2021
- Executed by: India
- Outcome: 800 evacuated
- Location of Kabul airport in Afghanistan Operation Devi Shakti (South Asia) Operation Devi Shakti (West and Central Asia) Operation Devi Shakti (Asia)

Operation Devi Shakti (transl. Operation Goddess Shakti) was an operation of the Indian Armed Forces to evacuate Indian citizens and foreign nationals from Afghanistan after the collapse of the Islamic Republic of Afghanistan and the fall of Kabul, the capital city, to the Taliban.

== Background ==
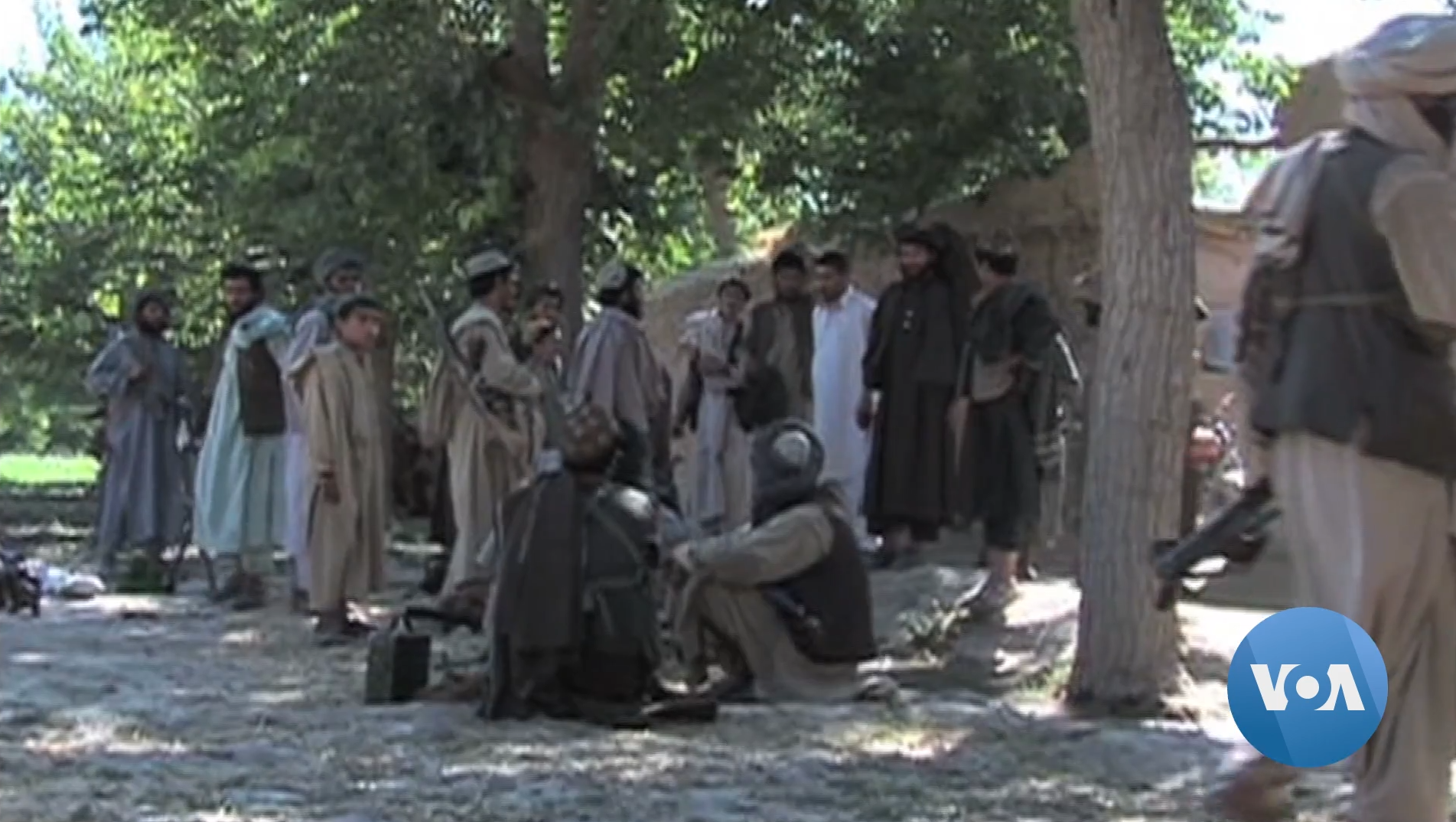
Taliban militants during the 2021 offensive

The Taliban and allied militant groups began a widespread offensive on 1 May 2021, concurrent with the withdrawal of most U.S. troops from Afghanistan. See more at Ministry of External Affairs official website

== Kabul airlift ==
India evacuated over 800 people amid a deteriorating security situation in Kabul.

- On 16 August, 40 Indians were airlifted from Kabul to Delhi.
- 168 people, including 107 Indians and 23 Afghan Sikhs and Hindus, were flown from Kabul to Hindan Air Force Station near Delhi in a C-17 Globemaster III aircraft of the Indian Air Force (IAF).
- 87 Indians and two Nepalese nationals were brought back in a special Air India flight from Dushanbe, a day after they were evacuated to the Tajikistan capital in an IAF C-130J.
- On 21 August, 78 people, including 25 Indians and a number of Afghan Sikhs and Hindus, were taken to India from Dushanbe, a day after they were evacuated from Kabul to the Tajik city.

== See also ==
- Afghanistan–India relations
- 1990 airlift of Indians from Kuwait
- Operation Ganga
- Operation Raahat
- Operation Allies Refuge
- Operation Pitting
- Operation Miracle (2021)
- Operation AEGIS
