= Operation Miracle (2021) =

South Korean Afghanistan evacuation operation

- Part of 2021 evacuation from Afghanistan and the 2021 Taliban offensive and the War in Afghanistan (2001–2021)
- Operational scope: Humanitarian relief
- Type: Emergency evacuation
- Location: Afghanistan; 34°33′57″N 069°12′47″E
- Planned by: Ministry of Foreign Affairs and Republic of Korea Armed Forces
- Commanded by: Republic of Korea Air Force
- Objective: Evacuation of eligible Afghans
- Date: 24 August 2021 – 27 August 2021
- Executed by: South Korea
- Outcome: 390 eligible Afghans evacuated
- Location of Kabul airport in Afghanistan Operation Miracle (2021) (South Asia)

Operation Miracle (Korean: 미라클 작전) was an operation of the Republic of Korea Armed Forces to evacuate Afghan collaborators from Afghanistan after the fall of Kabul, the capital city, to the Taliban. Three C-130J and one KC-330 Cygnus which is an Airbus A330 MRTT were used for evacuation, and 390 personnel were evacuated.

== Background ==
Since early August, South Korea Ministry of National Defense planned to evacuate Afghan collaborators. After Kabul, the capital of Afghanistan had fallen to the Taliban during 2021 Taliban offensive, the South Korean government evacuated its local residents and officials and made temporary official residence in Qatar on August 17. As a planning operation, related departure and military units kept the operation confidential to secure the safety of Afghan people.

== See also ==
- Operation Allies Refuge – American rescue operation
- Operation Pitting – British concurrent rescue operation
- Operation Devi Shakti – Indian concurrent rescue operation
- Hungnam evacuation
