= Operation Apagan =

French military operation

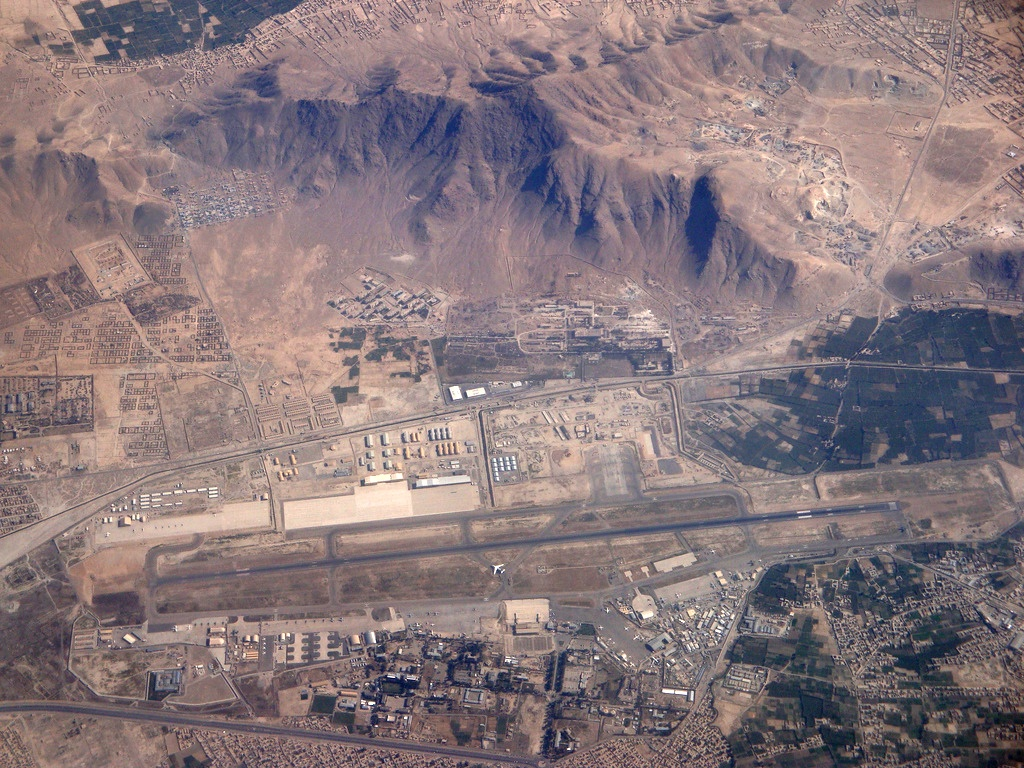
People were evacuated from Kabul airport

Operation Apagan was a French military operation in which the French evacuated those put at risk due to their proximity to the French military. The operation occurred at the end of the war in Afghanistan, which France had joined after 9/11 in 2001.

== Background ==
In 2001, France was part of Operation Enduring Freedom as a response to 9/11; France had pledged to help as soon as September 18, 2001.

France withdrew troops in 2012 but kept a military presence in Afghanistan. During the original operation and their military presence, France used Afghans as cooks and interpreters, as well as in other roles. The French president, Emmanuel Macron, said, "Our duty and our sense of integrity demand that we protect those who help us: interpreters, drivers, cooks, and so many others."

The situation had reached the point of needing evacuation due to the collapse of the Afghan government along with peace agreements. As the situation detrioated within Afghanistan countries began to need to evacuate their diplomatic services and it was announced on August 15 that the French, US, and British embasies in Kabul would close by the weekend.

== Operation ==
The operation ran between August 15 and 27, 2021. The operation involved multiple flights with 2 planes being specifically sent for this operation and the rest being in the near area. Flights went to the United Arab Emirates, where people were then moved to France.

In total, there were 26 "rotations" from Abu Dhabi to Kabul and then back to Abu Dhabi. There were 16 flights from Abu Dhabi to Paris. Almost 3,000 people were evacuated, with the majority (2,600) being Afghans.

== See also ==
- War in Afghanistan (2001–2021)
- North Atlantic Treaty
- 2021 Kabul airlift
