= Michael Kurilla =

Retired American general (b. 1966)

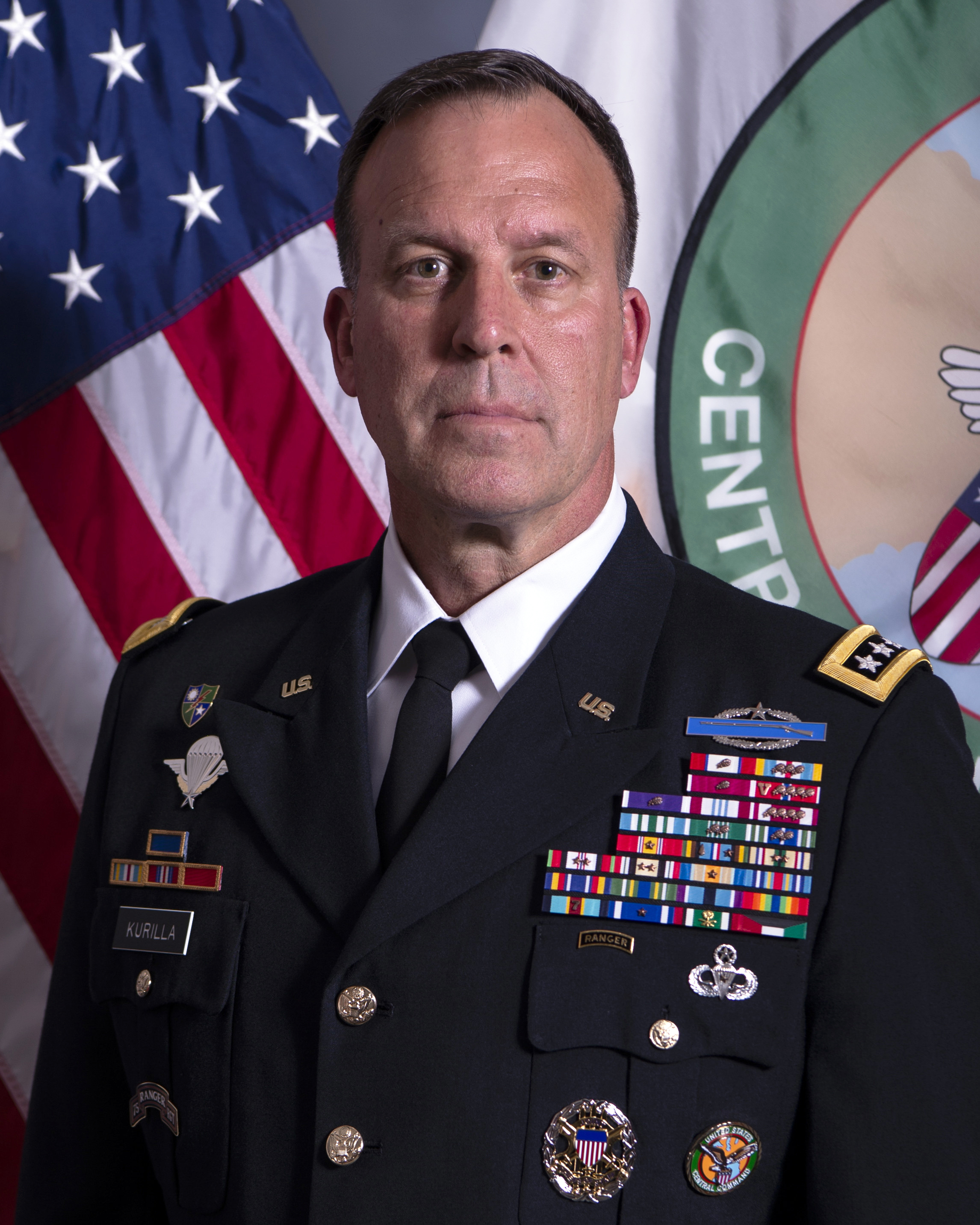
- Official portrait, 2022
- Born: Michael Erik Kurilla; 16 May 1966 (age 60); California, U.S.
- Education: United States Military Academy (BS); Regis University (MBA); National War College (MS)
- Military career
- Allegiance: United States
- Branch: United States Army
- Service years: 1988–2025
- Rank: General
- Nickname: Gorilla
- Commands: United States Central Command; XVIII Airborne Corps; 82nd Airborne Division; 75th Ranger Regiment; 2nd Ranger Battalion; 1st Battalion, 24th Infantry Regiment
- Conflicts: Operation Just Cause; Gulf War; Operation Uphold Democracy; Iraq War; Battle of Mosul; War in Afghanistan; War against the Islamic State; Operation Inherent Resolve; Red Sea crisis; Operation Prosperity Guardian; Operation Rough Rider; 2024 Iran–Israel conflict; April 2024 Iranian strikes on Israel; Twelve-Day War; Operation Midnight Hammer
- Awards: Army Distinguished Service Medal (2); Defense Superior Service Medal (4); Legion of Merit (2); Bronze Star (5); Purple Heart (2)
- Michael Kurilla's voice Kurilla's opening statement at a Senate Armed Services Committee hearing on the FY2024 USCENTCOM posture Recorded 16 March 2023

Michael Erik Kurilla (born 16 May 1966) is a retired American general who last served as the commander of United States Central Command from 2022 to 2025. He presided over the response to attacks on U.S. forces and other unrest after the October 7 attacks, and the U.S. involvement in the Twelve-Day War.

Kurilla was born in California and raised in Minnesota. He graduated from the United States Military Academy in 1988, and was commissioned as an Infantry officer in the Army. During his career he was deployed for Operation Just Cause and the Gulf War while serving in the 82nd Airborne Division, and for Operation Uphold Democracy, the Kosovo Force, and the Stabilisation Force in Bosnia and Herzegovina while serving in the 75th Ranger Regiment.

His notable commands have included the 75th Ranger Regiment from 2009 to 2011 and the 82nd Airborne Division from 2016 to 2018. Kurilla was stationed in the Middle East from 2004 to 2014, where he was awarded two Purple Hearts and the Bronze Star with valor during the Iraq War. He served as the chief of staff of Central Command from 2018 to 2019 and as the commanding general of XVIII Airborne Corps from 2019 to 2022. During the latter, he oversaw the deployment of the corps to Europe amidst the 2021–22 Russo-Ukrainian crisis.

== Early life and education ==
He was born in California on 16 May 1966 and raised in Elk River, Minnesota. Kurilla received a bachelor's degree in aerospace engineering from the United States Military Academy, an MBA from Regis University, and a master's degree in national security studies from the National War College. After graduating from West Point, he was commissioned into the United States Army as an infantry officer in 1988.

== Army career ==
From 1989, Kurilla participated in the United States invasion of Panama and in the Gulf War, while serving as a platoon leader in 3rd Battalion, 505th Infantry Regiment, 82nd Airborne Division. He was awarded the Bronze Star and the Army Commendation Medal during that time. From 1991, he served in the 3rd Ranger Battalion, 75th Ranger Regiment, at Fort Benning, Georgia. From 1993, Kurilla served as a company commander in the 1st Battalion, 5th Infantry Regiment, 2nd Infantry Division, in South Korea.

He returned to the 3rd Ranger Battalion in 1994, and was deployed to Haiti during Operation Uphold Democracy. From 1996 to 1998, he was a company commander in the battalion. He was also part of the Kosovo Force and the Stabilization Force in Bosnia and Herzegovina. Kurilla served as the S-3 officer of the 173rd Airborne Brigade in Italy from 2000 to 2001, and as chief of operations of the Southern European Task Force, Africa (SETAF) in 2001. From 2002 to 2003, Kurilla was the aide-de-camp to the commanding general of United States Army Europe.

From 2004 to 2014, he was stationed in the geographic area of responsibility of the United States Central Command, deploying to Iraq, Afghanistan, and Syria. In the fall of 2004, he deployed to Iraq as the commander of 1st Battalion, 24th Infantry Regiment, 1st Brigade, 25th Infantry Division. He was awarded a Bronze Star with "V" device after a battle in Mosul in which he "was shot three times but continued to fire back at insurgents while directing his troops." During his time in Mosul from 2004 to 2005, the battalion was instrumental in restoring control over the city after successful insurgent attacks on Iraqi police stations in November 2004. Kurilla was awarded two Purple Hearts and the Bronze Star Medal with valor for his actions in the Iraq War.

Kurilla later commanded the 2nd Ranger Battalion and the 75th Ranger Regiment. He was the assistant commanding general of Joint Special Operations Command from 2012 to 2014, deputy commanding general (maneuver) of 1st Infantry Division from 2014 to 2015, and deputy director for special operations and counter-terrorism of the Joint Staff from 2015 to 2016. He served as commander of the 82nd Airborne Division from 2016 to 2018 and Chief of Staff of U.S. Central Command from 2018 to 2019. He assumed command of the XVIII Airborne Corps in October 2019. In early 2022, he deployed to Germany to oversee U.S. troop deployments in response to the 2021–2022 Russo-Ukrainian crisis.

=== CENTCOM commander ===
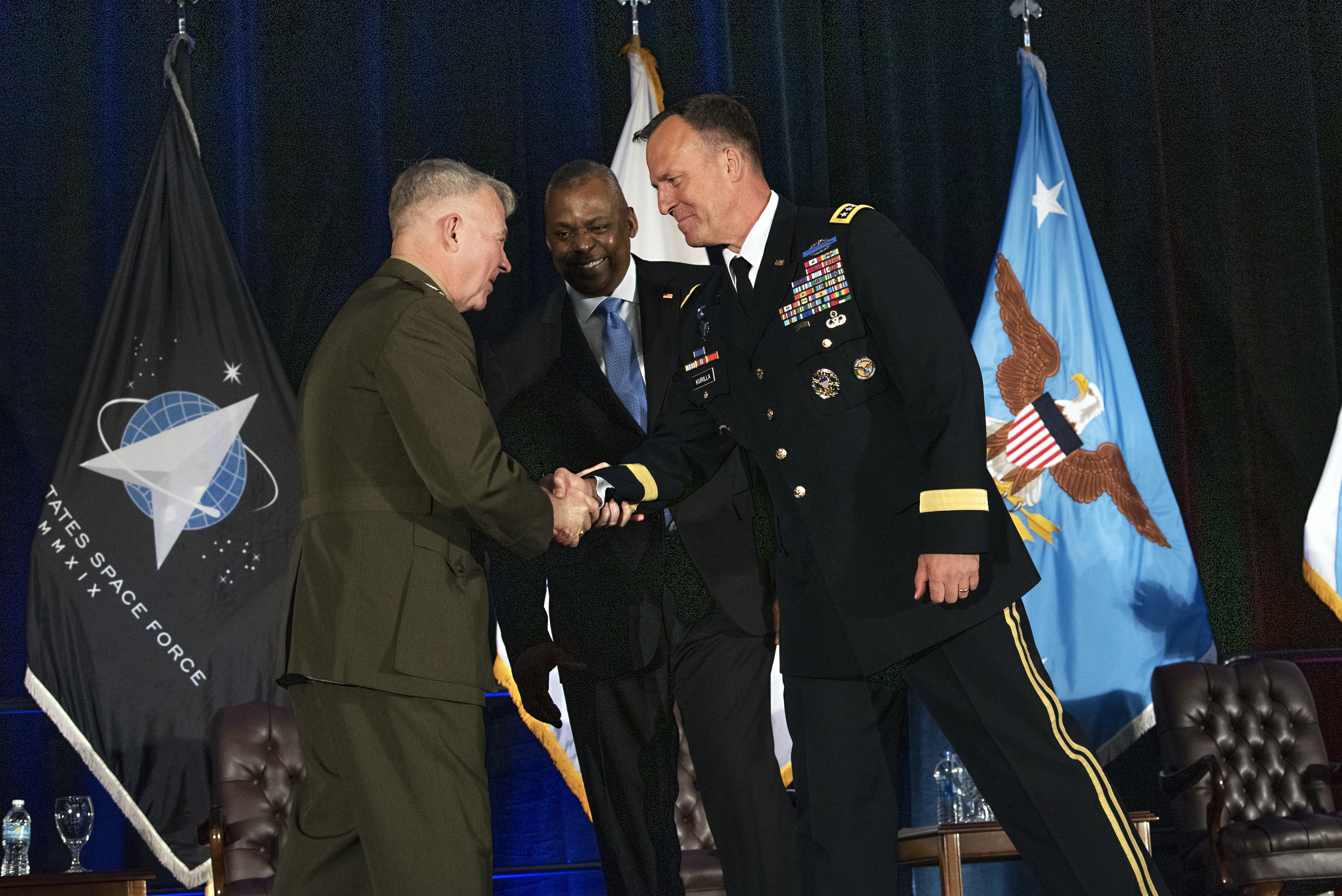
Gen. Kurilla is congratulated by his predecessor, Gen Frank McKenzie as he assumes command of CENTCOM on 1 April 2022.

In January 2022, he was nominated for promotion to four-star general and assignment as commander of the United States Central Command. Kurilla took up the post in April 2022. General Mark Milley, the chairman of the Joint Chiefs of Staff at the time of his nomination, described Kurilla as the "perfect leader of CENTCOM" due to his knowledge and his experience in both combat and staff officer positions. As the CENTCOM commander when the violence broke out in the region after the October 7 attacks and the start of the Gaza war, Kurilla has provided the Joe Biden and Donald Trump administrations with military options and oversaw their implementation. Kurilla worked to respond to attacks on U.S. forces in Iraq, Syria, Jordan, and in the Red Sea.

In April 2024 he was dispatched to Israel in anticipation of an Iranian counter-attack following the 2024 Iranian consulate airstrike in Damascus by Israel on April 1, in which several Iranian military leaders were killed. After the Iranian strikes against Israel that occurred that month, Kurilla began organizing a regional air defense network among countries that do not have diplomatic relations with Israel. In September he again visited Israel for consultations with defence minister Yoav Gallant. As of November 2024, Kurilla was under investigation after shoving an airman upon being asked to take his seat and buckle up for his safety during a flight to Israel.

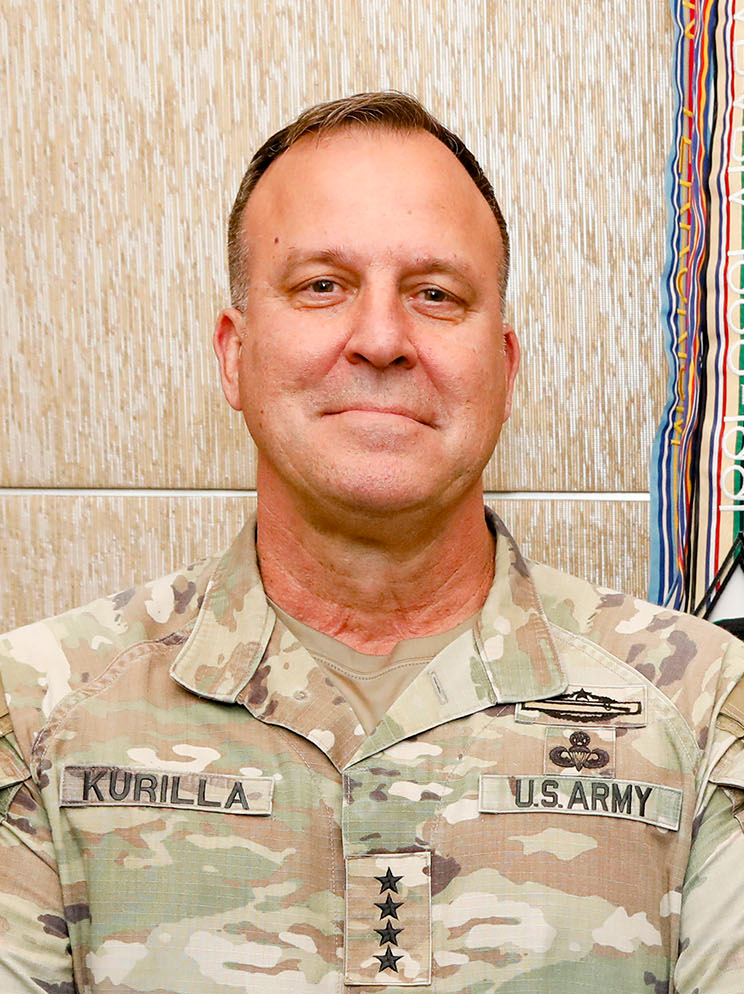
General Michael Kurilla in 2025.

In early 2025, he was reportedly one of the two candidates considered by the second Trump administration to replace General Charles Q. Brown Jr. as the Chairman of the Joint Chiefs of Staff, but the position was given to Dan Caine. In the spring of 2025, he oversaw Operation Rough Rider, the airstrikes against the Houthi movement in Yemen.

On 10 June 2025, during the negotiations between the United States and Iran on its nuclear program, Kurilla said at a congressional hearing that he prepared a "wide range" of military options for President Donald Trump if negotiations fail. Kurilla has called for a military response against Iran following the Twelve-Day War; his role in the conflict was considered to be unusually significant, with U.S. defence secretary Pete Hegseth seen as deferring to Kurilla during the conflict. He oversaw Operation Midnight Hammer on 22 June, the strike on three Iranian nuclear facilities.

On 8 August 2025, he was succeeded by Brad Cooper as commander of U.S. Central Command. Kurilla recommended Cooper to President Donald Trump, who took Kurilla's advice into consideration.

== Post-Army career ==
In November 2025 Kurilla became a distinguished fellow of the Washington Institute for Near East Policy.

== Awards and decorations ==
Personal decorations
Army Distinguished Service Medal with one bronze oak leaf cluster
Defense Superior Service Medal with three oak leaf clusters
Legion of Merit with oak leaf cluster
Bronze Star Medal with "V" device and four oak leaf clusters
Purple Heart with oak leaf cluster
Defense Meritorious Service Medal
Meritorious Service Medal with four oak leaf clusters
Joint Service Commendation Medal
Army Commendation Medal with two oak leaf clusters
Army Achievement Medal with two oak leaf clusters
Unit awards
Army Presidential Unit Citation
Joint Meritorious Unit Award
Valorous Unit Award
Meritorious Unit Commendation
Campaign and service medals
National Defense Service Medal with one bronze service star
Armed Forces Expeditionary Medal with Arrowhead device and service star
Southwest Asia Service Medal with two service stars
Afghanistan Campaign Medal with two service stars
Iraq Campaign Medal with two service stars
Inherent Resolve Campaign Medal with service star
Global War on Terrorism Expeditionary Medal
Global War on Terrorism Service Medal
Korea Defense Service Medal
Service, training, and marksmanship awards
Humanitarian Service Medal
Army Service Ribbon
Army Overseas Service Ribbon with bronze award numeral 7
Foreign awards
NATO Medal for the former Yugoslavia with service star
Kuwait Liberation Medal (Saudi Arabia)
Kuwait Liberation Medal (Kuwait)
Nishan-e-Imtiaz (military) (Pakistan)

Other accoutrements
Combat Infantryman Badge with Star (denoting 2nd award)
Ranger tab
Master Parachutist Badge with one bronze jump star
Joint Chiefs of Staff Identification Badge
United States Central Command Badge
75th Ranger Regiment Combat Service Identification Badge
French Parachutist Badge
75th Ranger Regiment Distinctive Unit Insignia
10 Overseas Service Bars

== Personal life ==
Kurilla and his wife Mary Paige have two daughters.

Military offices
Preceded by Richard D. Clarke	Commander of the 75th Ranger Regiment; 2009–2011	Succeeded by Mark W. Odom
Preceded by Richard D. Clarke	Commanding General of the 82nd Airborne Division; 2016–2018	Succeeded by James Mingus
Preceded by Paul LaCamera	Commanding General of the XVIII Airborne Corps; 2019–2022	Succeeded by Chris Donahue
Preceded by Kenneth F. McKenzie Jr.	Commander of United States Central Command; 2022–2025	Succeeded by Brad Cooper
U.S. order of precedence (ceremonial)
Preceded by Kevin E. Lunday as acting Commandant of the Coast Guard	Order of precedence of the United States as Commander of U.S. Central Command	Succeeded by Michael E. Langley as Commander of U.S. Africa Command
