= Kenneth F. McKenzie Jr. =

American Marine Corps general

Kenneth Franklin McKenzie Jr.
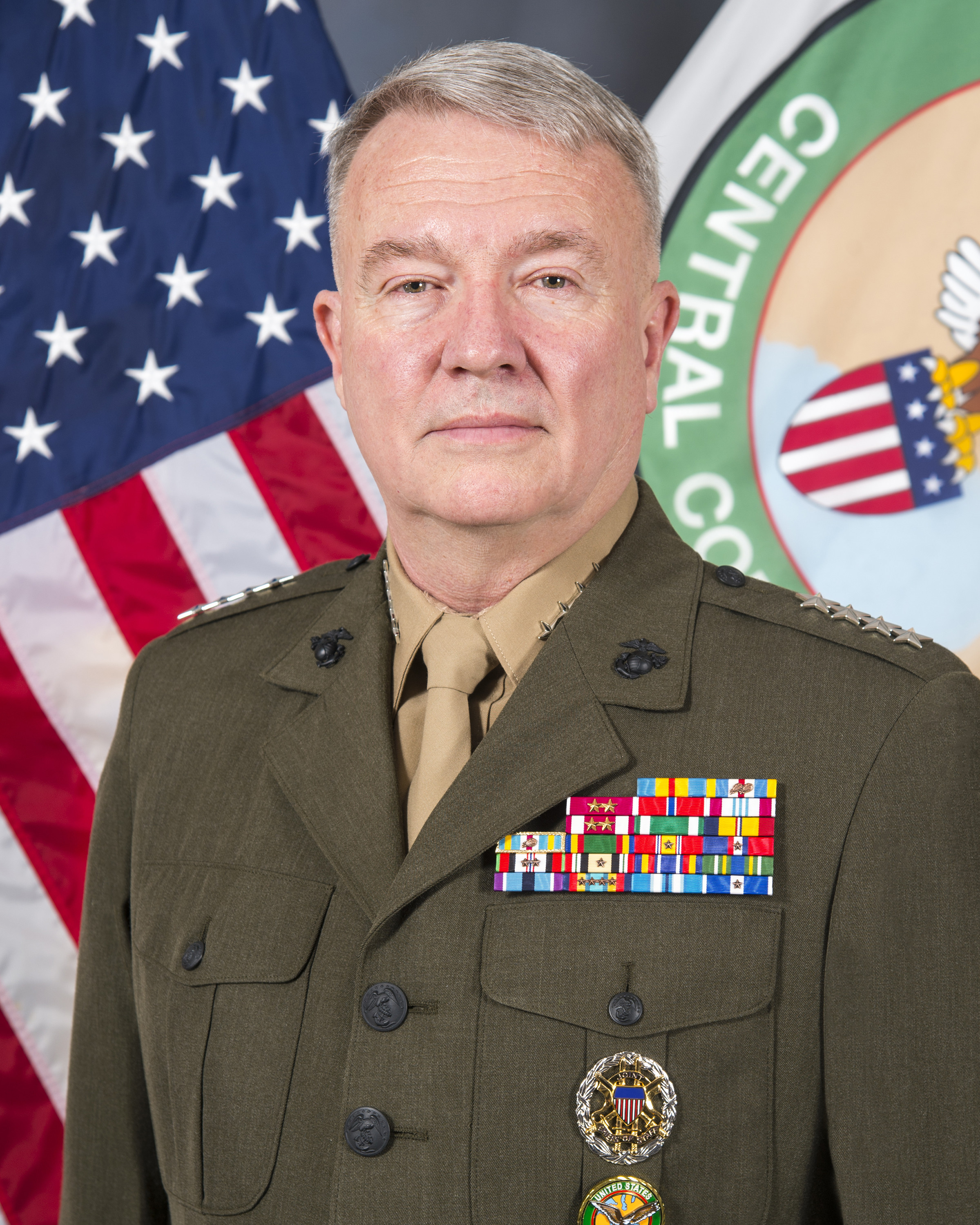
- Kenneth Franklin McKenzie Jr. in 2019
- Born: 1956 or 1957 (age 69–70); Birmingham, Alabama, U.S.
- Military career
- Allegiance: United States
- Branch: United States Marine Corps
- Service years: 1979–2022
- Rank: General
- Nickname: Frank
- Units: 1st Battalion, 6th Marines
- Commands: United States Central Command; Marine Corps Forces Central Command; 22nd Marine Expeditionary Unit; 1st Battalion, 6th Marines
- Conflicts: War in Afghanistan; Iraq War
- Awards: Defense Distinguished Service Medal; Navy Distinguished Service Medal; Defense Superior Service Medal (3); Legion of Merit (3); Bronze Star Medal

Kenneth Franklin McKenzie Jr. (born 1956 or 1957) is a retired United States Marine Corps general who served as the 14th commander of the United States Central Command from March 28, 2019, to April 1, 2022. He served as Director of the Joint Staff from July 5, 2017, after having previously served for two years as Director of Strategic Plans and Policy (J-5) on the Joint Staff.

In May 2022, he became the executive director of the Global and National Security Institute, University of South Florida, and in July 2022, he was appointed executive director for the Florida Center for Cybersecurity. He also serves as the President, Board of Directors, of the Institute for Applied Engineering, University of South Florida. On July 1, 2026, he became President of The Citadel in Charleston, South Carolina.

== Early life and education ==
A native of Birmingham, Alabama, McKenzie was commissioned in 1979, via the Naval Reserve Officers Training Corps at The Citadel. McKenzie holds an advanced degree from The Citadel Graduate College and is an honors graduate of the Marine Corps Command and Staff College as well as the School of Advanced Warfighting.

== Military career ==
As an infantry officer, McKenzie's assignments have included command of the 1st Battalion, 6th Marines, and of the 22nd Marine Expeditionary Unit, which he led on deployments to both Iraq and Afghanistan. He also served as Military Secretary to two Commandants of the Marine Corps.

McKenzie's general officer posts have included deputy director of Operations for the National Military Command Center in the Pentagon. In 2008, he was selected by the Chairman of the Joint Chiefs of Staff to serve as director of his new administration transition team, overseeing the transition of military forces under incoming President Barack Obama. He returned to Afghanistan serving as Deputy Chief of Staff for Stability under the International Security Assistance Force, followed by a tour as Director of Strategy, Plans and Policy at United States Central Command. He then returned to the Pentagon to serve as the Marine Corps Representative to the Quadrennial Defense Review and, after receiving his third star, was appointed Commanding General of United States Marine Forces Central Command.

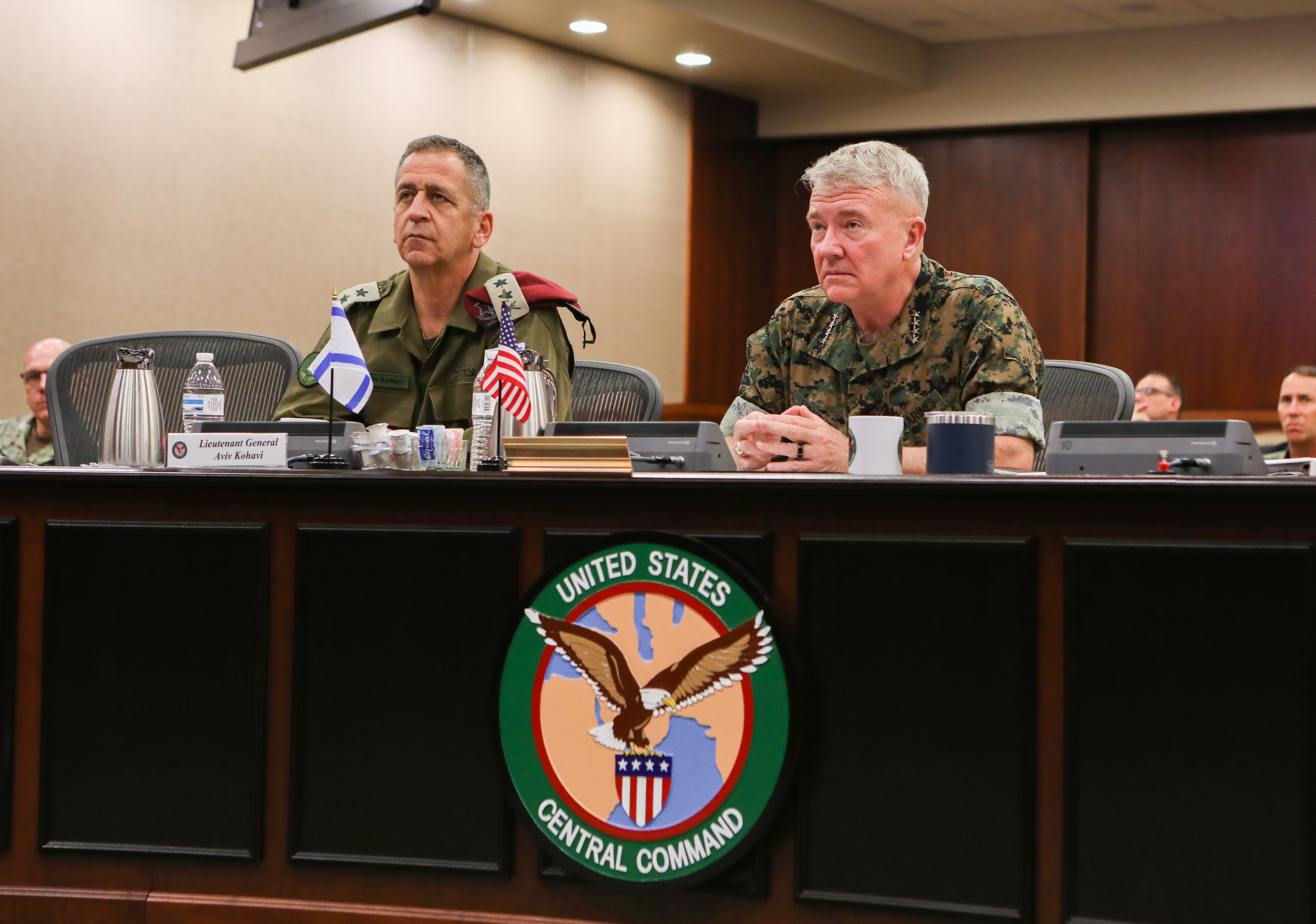
General McKenzie and Israel Defense Forces Chief of General Staff Aviv Kochavi attend a briefing at CENTCOM headquarters, June 2021

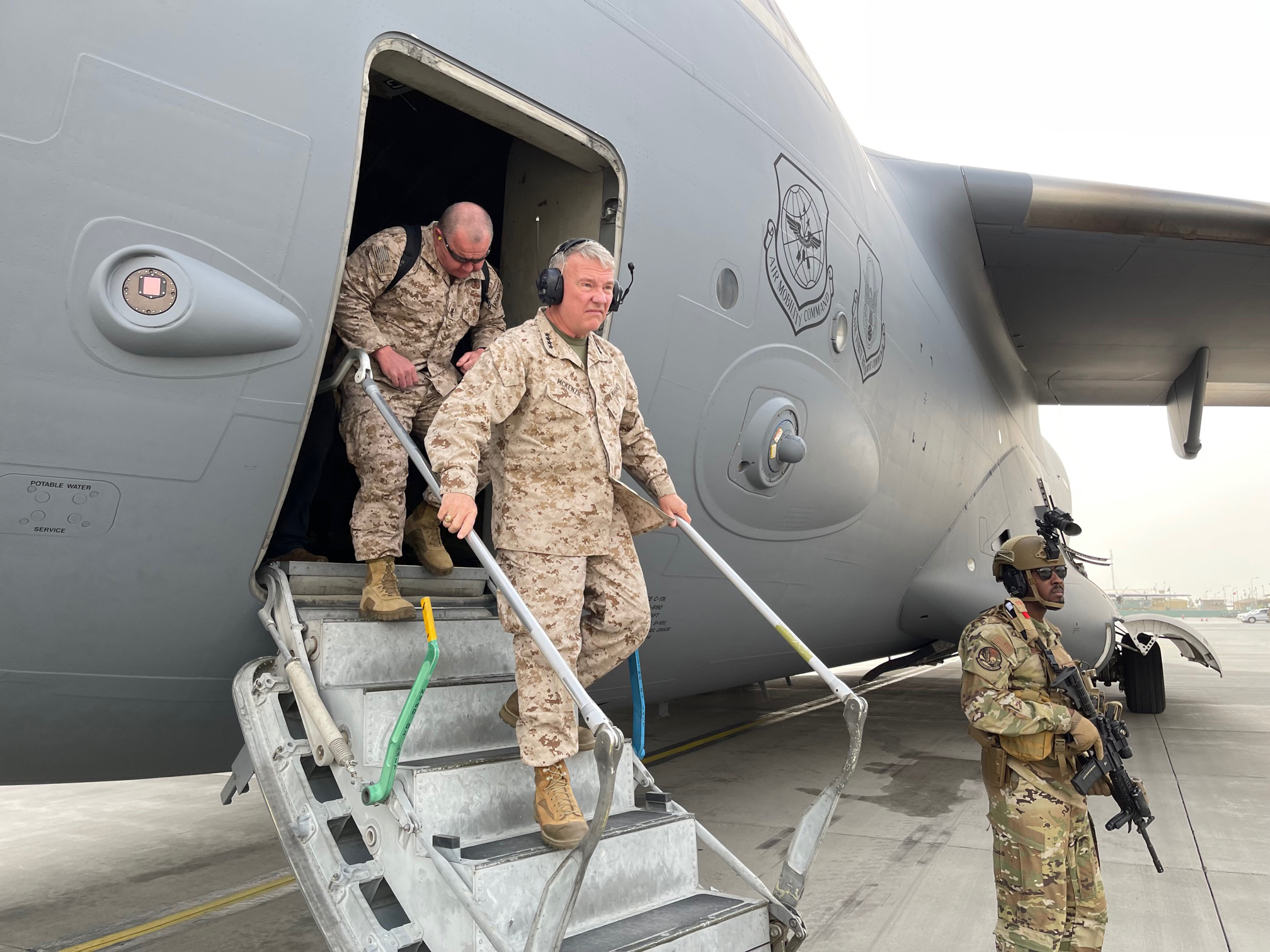
Gen. McKenzie at Hamid Karzai International Airport during the 2021 Fall of Kabul

As CENTCOM commander, McKenzie oversaw the successful high-profile special forces raid in Syria to kill or capture then-Islamic State leader Abu Bakr al-Baghdadi in October 2019, and the 2020–2021 withdrawals and reductions of U.S. troops from Iraq.

During the 2020–2021 Afghanistan withdrawal, McKenzie replaced General Austin "Scott" Miller as leader of U.S. and NATO forces in Afghanistan upon the latter's resignation on July 12, 2021, with Miller's departure perceived by some as "the symbolic end of the U.S. military mission in Afghanistan." One month later, McKenzie was responsible for the August 2021 Kabul drone strike which targeted and killed 10 civilians, 7 of whom were children. The main target of the strike, aid worker Zemerai Ahmadi, had been misidentified as an ISIS-Khorasan militant. McKenzie later acknowledged the strike was a "mistake" and stated, “I offer my sincere apology” during a press briefing.

McKenzie retired from active duty on 1 April 2022, after relinquishing command of CENTCOM to General Michael Kurilla.

On 23 March 2026, it was announced General McKenzie would become the 21st President of his alma mater, The Citadel.

== Awards and decorations ==

1st row	Defense Distinguished Service Medal			
2nd row	Navy Distinguished Service Medal	Defense Superior Service Medal with two bronze oak leaf clusters	Legion of Merit with two gold award stars	Bronze Star Medal
3rd row	Defense Meritorious Service Medal	Meritorious Service Medal with two award stars	Navy and Marine Corps Commendation Medal	Combat Action Ribbon
4th row	Joint Meritorious Unit Award with one oak leaf cluster	Navy Unit Commendation	National Defense Service Medal with one bronze service star	Kosovo Campaign Medal with service star
5th row	Afghanistan Campaign Medal with two service stars	Iraq Campaign Medal with service star	Global War on Terrorism Service Medal	Korea Defense Service Medal
6th row	Humanitarian Service Medal	Navy Sea Service Deployment Ribbon with four service stars	Navy Arctic Service Ribbon	NATO Medal for Kosovo with service star
Badge	Office of the Joint Chiefs of Staff Identification Badge			
Badge	United States Central Command Badge			

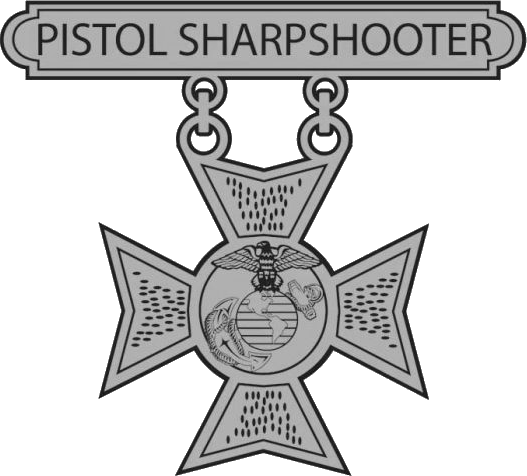
- General McKenzie earned several awards of the Rifle Expert Badge as well as the Pistol Sharpshooter Badge.

== Effective dates of promotion ==
Promotions
Insignia	Rank	Date
	Second Lieutenant	June 8, 1979
	First Lieutenant	June 1, 1981
	Captain	February 1, 1985
	Major	Sept 1, 1989
	Lieutenant Colonel	Oct 5, 1995
	Colonel	Oct 8, 2001
	Brigadier General	July 1, 2007
	Major General	March 5, 2011
	Lieutenant General	June 3, 2014
	General	March 15, 2019

Military offices
Preceded by Robert Neller	Commander of the United States Marine Forces Central Command; 2014–2015	Succeeded by William D. Beydler
Preceded by Frank Craig Pandolfe	Director for Strategy, Plans and Policy of the Joint Staff; 2015–2017	Succeeded by Richard D. Clarke
Preceded by William C. Mayville Jr.	Director of the Joint Staff; 2017–2019	Succeeded by Michael M. Gilday
Preceded by Joseph Votel	Commander of United States Central Command; 2019–2022	Succeeded by Michael Kurilla
