= Nutrition and Education International =

Nutrition & Education International
- Type: Charitable foundation
- Purpose: Humanitarian
- Region served: Afghanistan
- Founder: Dr. Steven Kwon
- Website: http://www.neifoundation.org/

Nutrition and Education International (NEI) is a non-partisan, non-profit 501(c) 3 organization based in Pasadena, California. NEI was formed in 2003 by Dr. Steven Kwon to fight widespread malnutrition among women and children who live in high-mortality areas in Afghanistan. NEI is supported and run by volunteers who work full-time in various professional fields and donate their time and expertise to bring proper nutrition to impoverished communities in Afghanistan.
