= Operation Allies Refuge =

2021 US evacuation effort in Afghanistan

- Part of the American military withdrawal from Afghanistan
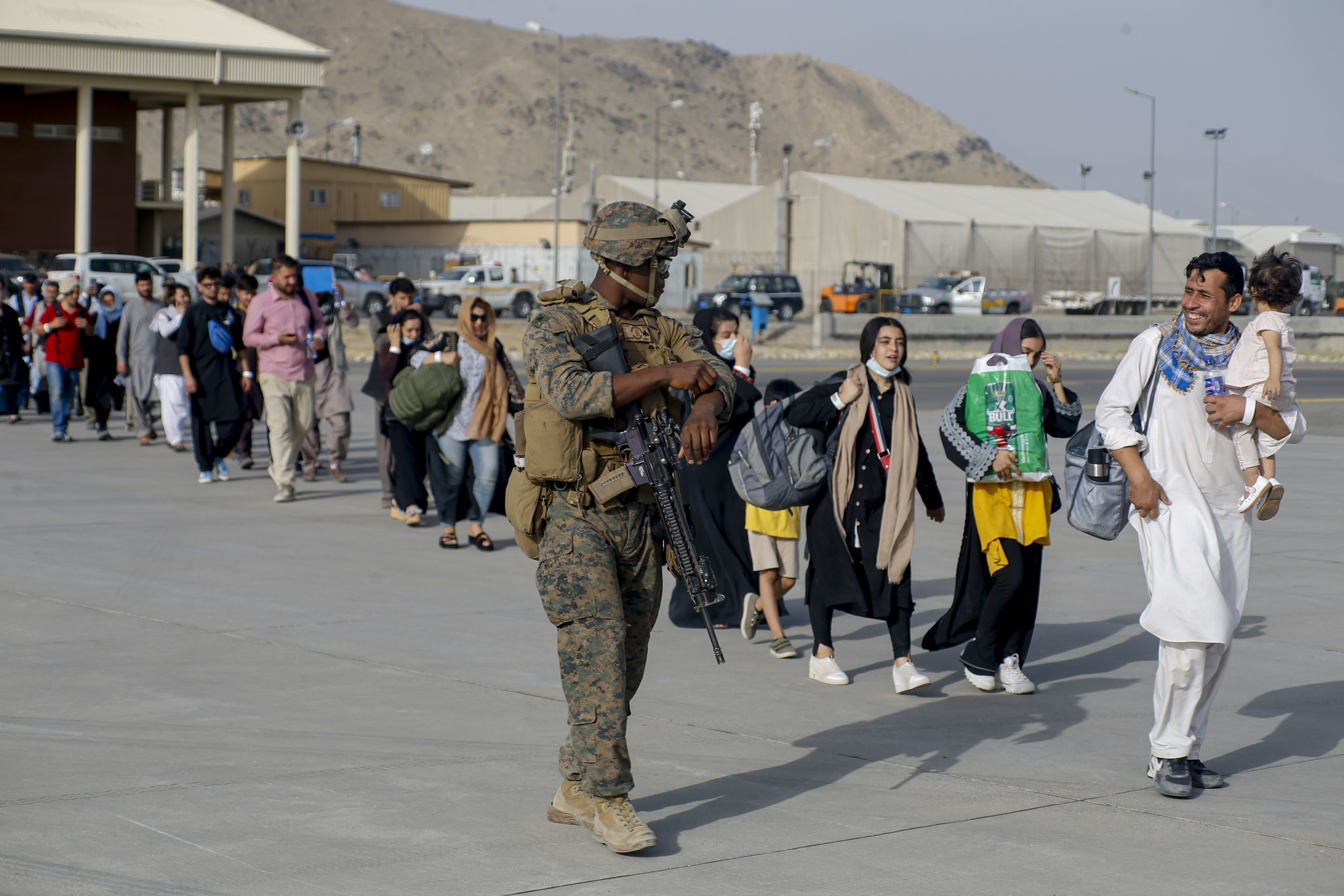
- Evacuees at Hamid Karzai International Airport are escorted by a U.S. Marine from the 24th Marine Expeditionary Unit, 18 August 2021
- Type: Non-combatant evacuation operation (NEO)
- Location: Afghanistan
- Commanded by: RAdm. Peter Vasely
- Objective: Evacuation of American citizens, embassy staff, and allied Afghan nationals
- Date: First phase: 14 July 2021 – 15 August 2021; Second phase: 15 August 2021 – 30 August 2021
- Executed by: United States
- Outcome: 123,000 people evacuated
- Casualties: 195+ killed

Operation Allies Refuge was an evacuation effort carried out by the United States during the 2021 Taliban offensive. It took place in the final weeks of the War in Afghanistan and saw the airlifting of certain at-risk Afghan civilians (particularly coalition-allied interpreters), employees of the American embassy in Kabul, and other prospective applicants for the U.S. Special Immigrant Visa (SIV). American personnel also helped NATO and other regional allies in their respective evacuation efforts from Hamid Karzai International Airport in the capital city of Kabul. The operation was concurrent with the broader American military withdrawal from Afghanistan and the multinational evacuation of eligible foreigners and vulnerable Afghans.

SIV applicants were airlifted to the U.S., where they were temporarily housed by the American military while they completed their SIV requirements.

== Units involved ==
The following is a list of the units involved in the security of the evacuation during the operation.

Central Intelligence Agency

- Special Activities Center
  - Ground Branch

Joint Special Operations Command

- 1st Special Forces Operational Detachment-Delta (Delta Force/CAG) A Squadron elements
- Intelligence Support Activity (ISA) elements
- 160th Special Operations Aviation Regiment (160th SOAR) (Nightstalkers)
- Naval Special Warfare Development Group (DEVGRU/SEAL Team 6) Red Squadron elements

U.S. Army

- 82nd Airborne Division
  - 1st Brigade Combat Team, 82nd Airborne Division
  - 2nd Brigade Combat Team, 82nd Airborne Division
    - 501st Infantry Regiment
    - 504th Infantry Regiment
- 10th Mountain Division
  - 30th Infantry Regiment
  - 31st Infantry Regiment
- 16th Military Police Brigade

Army National Guard

- 86th Infantry Brigade Combat Team (Mountain) (Vermont ARNG)
  - 172nd Infantry Regiment
- Minnesota Army National Guard
  - 1-194 Armor Regiment (Task Force Bastards)

U.S. Air Force

- 62nd Airlift Wing
  - 7th Airlift Squadron

Air National Guard

- 105th Airlift Wing
- 176th Wing
  - 144th Airlift Squadron
- 517th Airlift Squadron

U.S. Marine Corps

- 24th Marine Expeditionary Unit (24th MEU)
  - 1st Battalion, 8th Marines
  - 2nd Battalion, 1st Marines

== Operational history ==
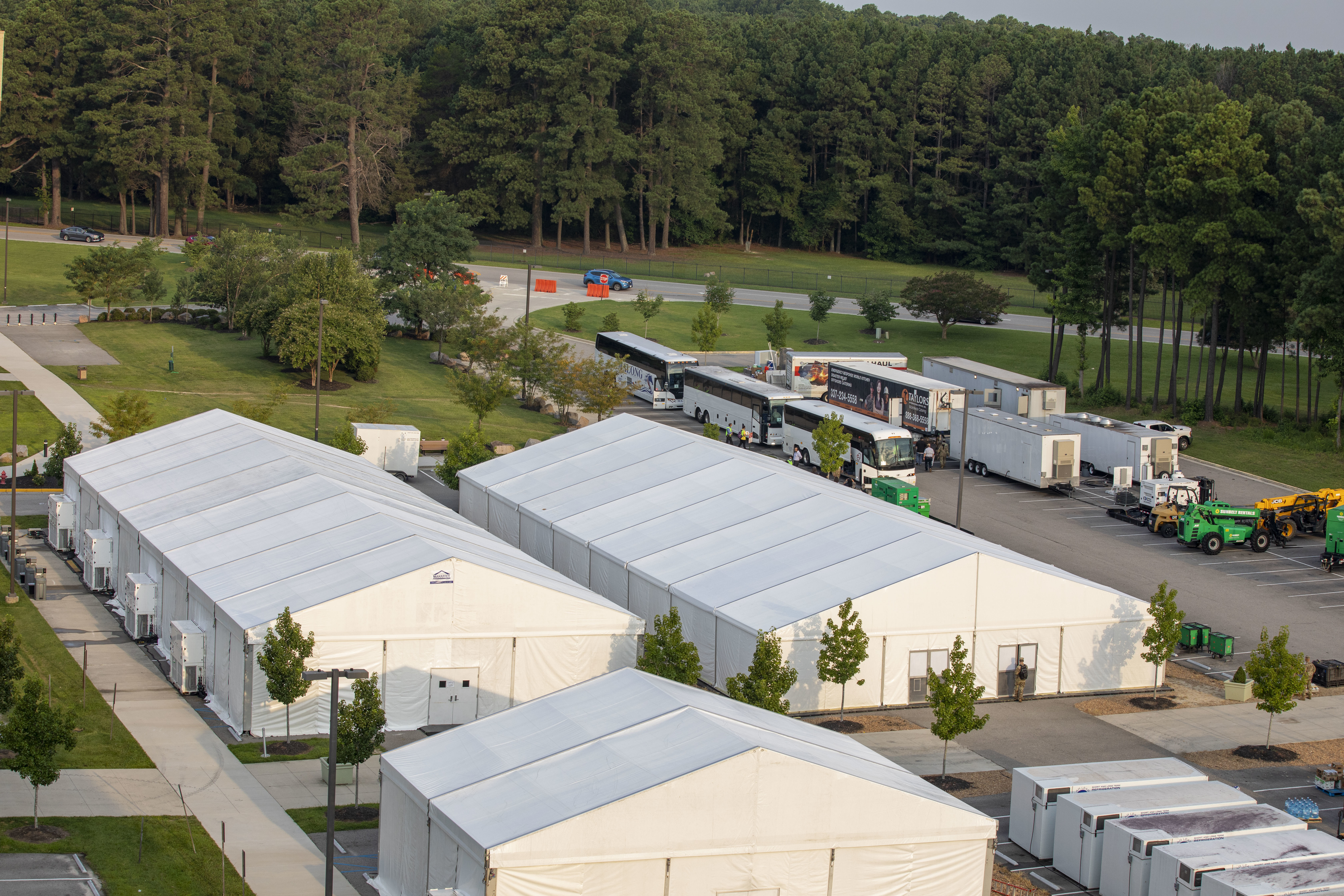
Temporary meal service and processing facilities for Afghan special immigrant visa applicants at Fort Lee, Virginia, July 2021

The operation's name was unveiled on 14 July 2021 by the Biden administration. On 22 July, the U.S. House of Representatives passed the Averting Loss of Life and Injury by Expediting SIVs (ALLIES) Act to increase the visa cap for Afghan interpreters and to expedite the Afghan SIV process.

On 30 July, the first group of 221 Afghan interpreters arrived at Fort Lee, Virginia, for SIV processing, with at least 20,000 SIV holders and applicants still to be moved from Afghanistan.

On 12 August, following continued Taliban victories across Afghanistan, the Biden administration announced that it would deploy 3,000 U.S. troops to Hamid Karzai International Airport to help evacuate embassy personnel, U.S. nationals and SIV applicants. On 13 August, Marines and Army National Guardsmen from 1st Battalion, 8th Marine Regiment, 2nd Battalion, 1st Marine Regiment, and 1st Battalion, 194th Armored Regiment arrived in Kabul. On 17 August, Army paratroopers from the 82nd Airborne Division moved from Fort Bragg, North Carolina, to Kabul. Another 1,000 Army Infantry, Military Police, and Air Force personnel were deployed to As Sayliyah Army Base and Al Udeid Air Base to process Afghan SIV applicants in Qatar, assisting with the United States Customs and Border Protection, and United States Department of State. Meanwhile, U.S. embassy staff in Kabul were destroying sensitive materials and items featuring embassy logos or U.S. flags, a standard procedure during a drawdown. Helicopters shuttled people between the embassy compound and Kabul International Airport.

As of 26 August, Ramstein Air Base, Landstuhl Regional Medical Center, Grafenwöhr, Hohenfels, Spangdahlem Air Base and Rhine Ordnance Barracks in Germany, Naval Air Station Sigonella in Italy, Camp Bondsteel in Kosovo and Naval Station Rota in Spain also participated.

=== Kabul airlift ===
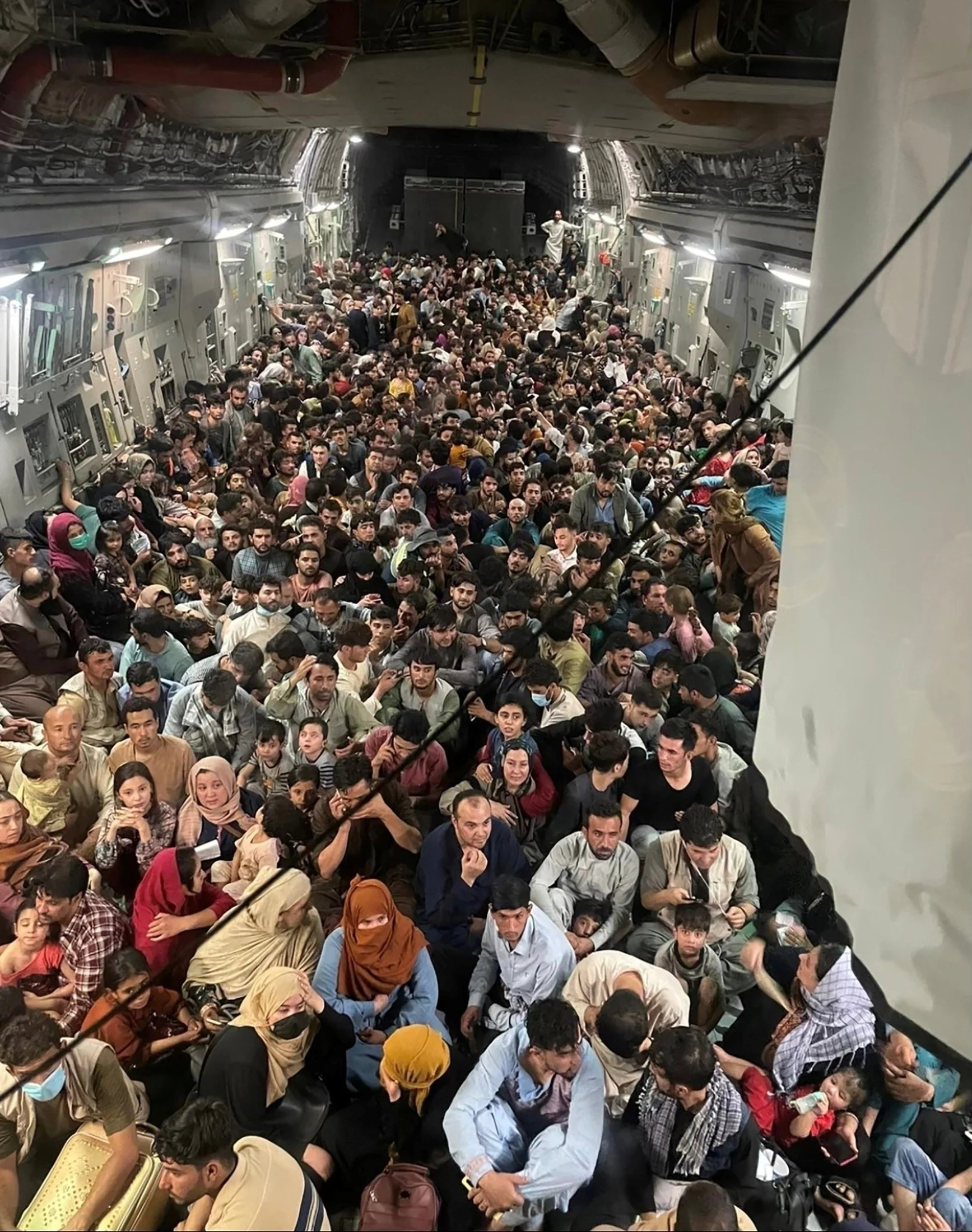
A U.S. Air Force C-17 Globemaster III evacuates 823 fleeing Afghan citizens from Hamid Karzai International Airport on 15 August 2021.

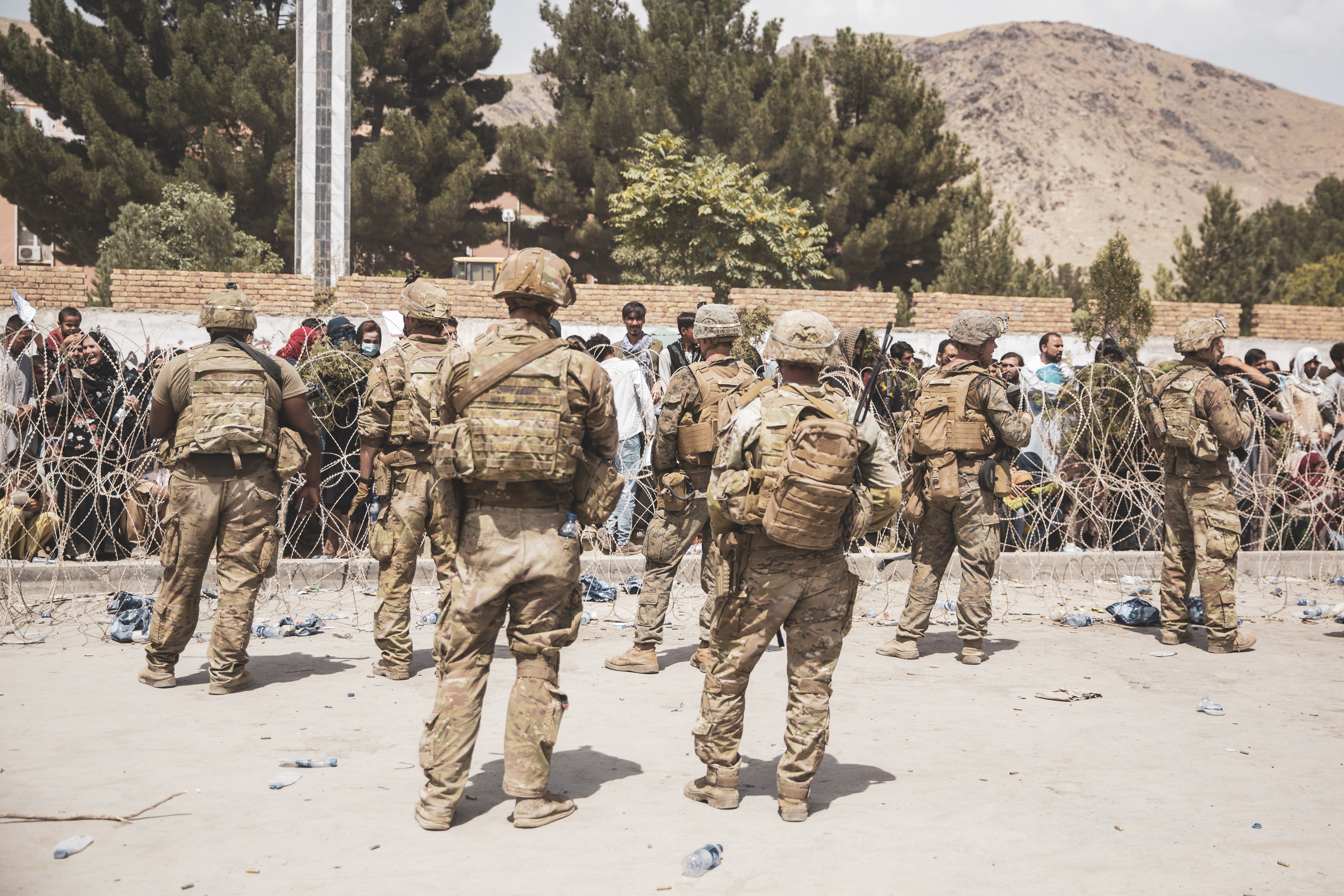
U.S. soldiers and Marines assist with security at an evacuation control checkpoint at Kabul Airport, 19 August

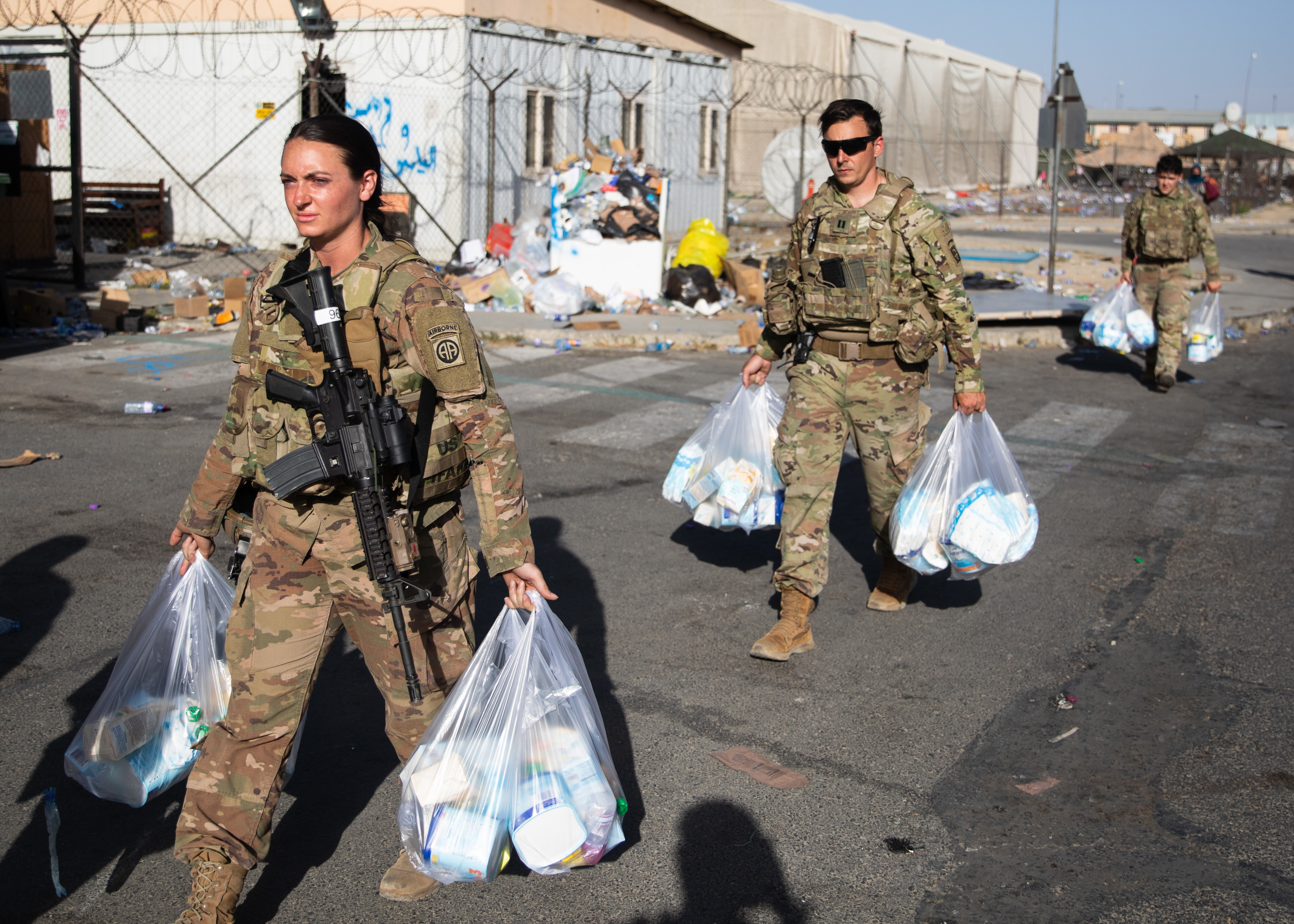
82nd Airborne Division paratroopers carrying supplies for Afghan families at Kabul Airport, 26 August 2021

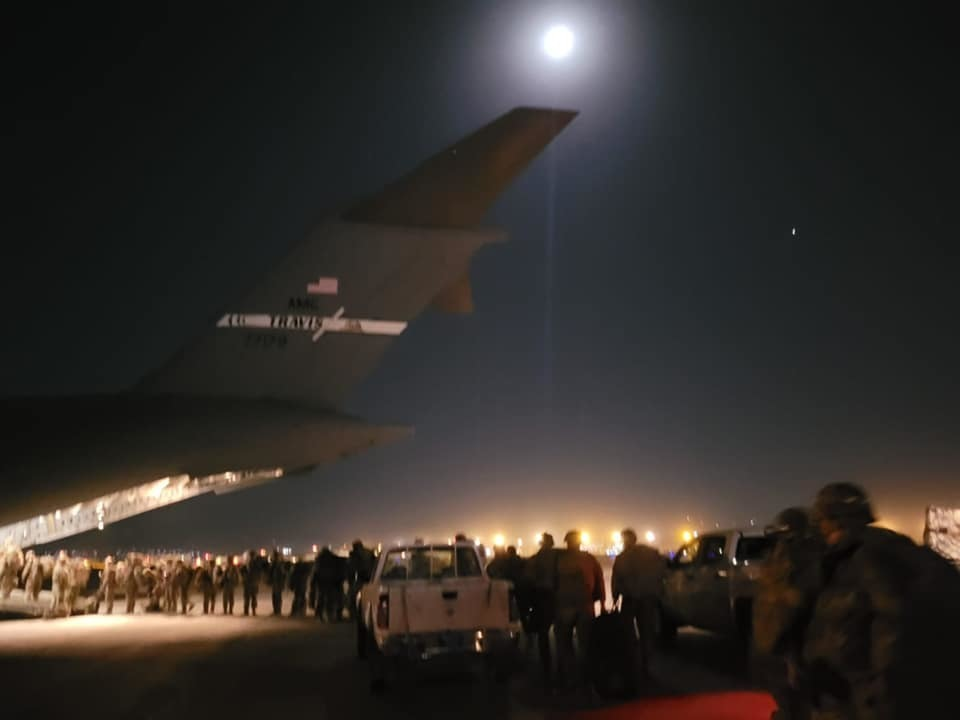
U.S. soldiers board a C-17 during final departures from Kabul Airport, 30 August 2021.

On 15 August, Kabul fell to the Taliban. Afghan security forces fled the capital and thousands of Afghan civilians hurried to the airport in hopes of boarding flights, resulting in chaotic scenes of Afghans attempting to force themselves aboard military planes. The Pentagon and the State Department said the military force at the airport would expand to nearly 6,000 troops.

U.S. military (The 24th Marine Exiditionary Unit and the 621st Air Force Contingency Response Wing) took control over the security and air traffic control of the airport later in the day. At this point, Operation Allies Refuge became concurrent with a new effort to airlift all SIV applicants, embassy personnel, American nationals, and eligible Afghans seeking to flee the country.

On 16 August, a C-17 cargo plane, whose usual passenger load is fewer than 150 Army paratroopers, safely evacuated roughly 823 people to the Al Udeid Air Base in Qatar, setting a new record for the C-17. (The initial count was roughly 640, but U.S. Air Force officials later said they had not initially counted children sitting in their parents' laps on the buses.) The Pentagon confirmed that the head of U.S. Central Command, General Kenneth F. McKenzie Jr., met Taliban leaders based in Qatar's capital Doha. The Taliban officials agreed to terms set by McKenzie for refugees to flee using Kabul Airport.

U.S. Army Maj. General William Taylor said that nine C-17s arrived overnight, bringing equipment and 1,000 more troops. Separately, seven C-17s airlifted 700 to 800 passengers out of the airport, 165 of which were American citizens while the rest were SIV applicants and third-country nationals.

On 17 August, about 1,100 people were evacuated on 13 flights. The White House said more than 3,200 U.S. citizens, permanent residents and refugees were evacuated from the country, and nearly 2,000 Afghan interpreters were flown to the U.S. for SIV processing.

On August 18, Deputy Secretary of State Wendy Sherman said U.S. military flights evacuated about 2,000 people, and said it has processed more than 4,840 people for evacuation. The State Department said the U.S. military has evacuated nearly 5,000 people from the country. On August 19, more than 2,000 people were evacuated on 12 flights. The Pentagon said it has evacuated about 7,000 people from the country.

It was reported on 19 August that U.S. forces had rescued Mohammad Khalid Wardak, a high-profile Afghan police chief that had worked extensively with U.S. special forces in its war against the Taliban and al-Qaeda. According to Robert McCreary, a former congressional chief of staff and White House official under George W. Bush, Khalid and his family were rescued via helicopter by U.S. forces in a night-time operation named Operation Promises Kept. Khalid had lost contact with rescuers while evading Taliban forces for days in Kabul after he was unable to reach the airport following the government's collapse, and his supporters in the U.S. military had chosen to evacuate him as his vocal opposition to the Taliban made him at high-risk of reprisals. McCreary said that Khalid and his family were "safe in an undisclosed location" and added that multiple allies, including the British, had helped in the operation's success.

On 20 August, about 5,700 people were evacuated on 16 flights. The Pentagon said it has evacuated about 12,700 people from the country. On 21 August, United States Army Major General William D. Taylor announced that 17,000 people have been evacuated in the past few weeks, including 2,500 Americans. The Taliban has at times blocked evacuation efforts made by the United Kingdom.

On 22 August, President Joe Biden said that American troops may remain in Afghanistan past the August 31 deadline. He also announced that 28,000 people have been evacuated since 15 August, and that 33,000 people have been evacuated since July.

Also on 22 August, the Department of Defense ordered the activation of the Civil Reserve Air Fleet to assist in the evacuation. The current activation is for 18 planes: four from United Airlines; three each from American Airlines, Atlas Air, Delta Air Lines and Omni Air; and two from Hawaiian Airlines. Commercial airline pilots and crews would help transport thousands of Afghans who are arriving at U.S. bases in Bahrain, Qatar and the United Arab Emirates. From the bases in the Middle East, the airliners would augment military flights carrying Afghans to Germany, Italy, Spain and other stops in Europe, and then ultimately to the United States.

On 23 August, United States Army Major General William D. Taylor announced that Joint Base McGuire-Dix-Lakehurst in New Jersey, was ready to receive Afghan evacuees in addition to Fort McCoy, Wisconsin; Fort Bliss, Texas; and Fort Lee, Virginia. Pentagon Press Secretary John F. Kirby said the goal was to be able to receive about 25,000 evacuees in coming weeks.

On 25 August, Blackwater founder Erik Prince offered to charge $6,500 for anyone who wanted to evacuate from Kabul. That same day, the total amount of evacuations topped 82,300.

Although the Taliban's conquest of the country led to the disintegration of the Afghan Armed Forces, an armed remnant of mostly 500 to 600 Afghan Commandos were at the airport helping U.S. troops provide perimeter security. The Pentagon said these Afghan troops would be evacuated if they desired.

On 27 August, the Department of Defense announced that three more U.S. military bases will be used to house up to 50,000 Afghan nationals who are applying for SIVs or are deemed "at risk" from the Taliban: Fort Pickett, Holloman Air Force Base and Marine Corps Base Quantico.

== Operation Allies Welcome ==
Afghan refugees resettled per 100K residents after the 2021 Afghan withdrawal and evacuation in each U.S. state and the District of Columbia according to CBS News

On 29 August 2021, President Joe Biden ordered the Department of Homeland Security (DHS) to lead Operation Allies Welcome, a civilian-led continuation of Allies Refuge with the task of managing the resettlement of refugees and providing "temporary housing, sustainment, and support inside the United States" for evacuees. DHS established the Unified Coordination Group allowing for collaboration with military, state and local governments, non-governmental organizations, and the private sector during Allies Welcome activities.

Between July 2021 and March 2022, over 73,000 Afghans were paroled into the US as part of Operation Allies Welcome. In some cases, they were sponsored and assisted by groups of private citizens called Sponsor Circles. The parolees were generally eligible for refugee and mainstream benefits in the US.

Afghans were generally paroled for a period of two years; an extension (re-parole) was available. Once in the US, Afghans could apply for asylum, Special Immigrant Visa, or other immigration status for which they qualified. As of 2025, of the asylum claims by Afghans which had been decided, over 97% had been approved.

On March 14, 2026, a day after being arrested by ICE on charges of violating his immigration parole, Mohammad Nazir Paktyawal died in detention in the Parkland Hospital in Dallas, Texas. Paktyawal, who was airlifted to the US on August 21, 2021, and had been arrested in 2025 for SNAP fraud and theft, was labeled by ICE as a "criminal illegal alien."

== Casualties ==
By 26 August 2021, at least 195 people had been killed at or near the Kabul International Airport as thousands of people tried to forcibly board planes. The majority were killed by a suicide bombing.

Six people were killed after trying to escape as stowaways: two people were seen falling to their deaths from the sky after clinging to the landing gear of a departing C-17 cargo plane, while three people clinging to the side of an Air Force jet were killed after being run over. Remains of another dead Afghan were found in the landing gear of the American C-17, after the pilots were forced to make an emergency landing in a nearby country because they were unable to retract the landing gear. Eleven more civilians died during stampedes at the airport, seven of whom died in a single incident on August 21. The Taliban occasionally fired shots at the airport as a form of crowd control; some people reportedly received gunshot wounds from the gunfire. Three more people died during gun incidents, including two armed men who fired into a crowd and were killed by U.S. troops, while the other was an Afghan guard killed during a gunfight between Afghan forces and unknown gunmen.

At least 182 people were killed and more than 200 others were wounded during a suicide bombing attack at the airport on August 26. The attack was carried out by Islamic State militants. At least 169 Afghan civilians and 13 US service members were among the killed. The dead Americans were identified as eleven marines, one soldier, and one Navy corpsman. Several more foreign troops and Taliban members were among the injured. Three of the dead Afghan civilians were also British citizens.

On 2 September, a nine-month-old baby died after arriving at the Philadelphia International Airport in Philadelphia, Pennsylvania, making her the first death of an evacuee on American soil.

== See also ==
- Operation Pitting
- Withdrawal of United States troops from Afghanistan (2020–2021)
- Soviet withdrawal from Afghanistan
- Operation Frequent Wind
- Operation Eagle Pull
- Operation Devi Shakti
- Operation Miracle (2021)
- Welcome.US
