= Colby Jenkins =

American politician and military officer

Colby C. Jenkins
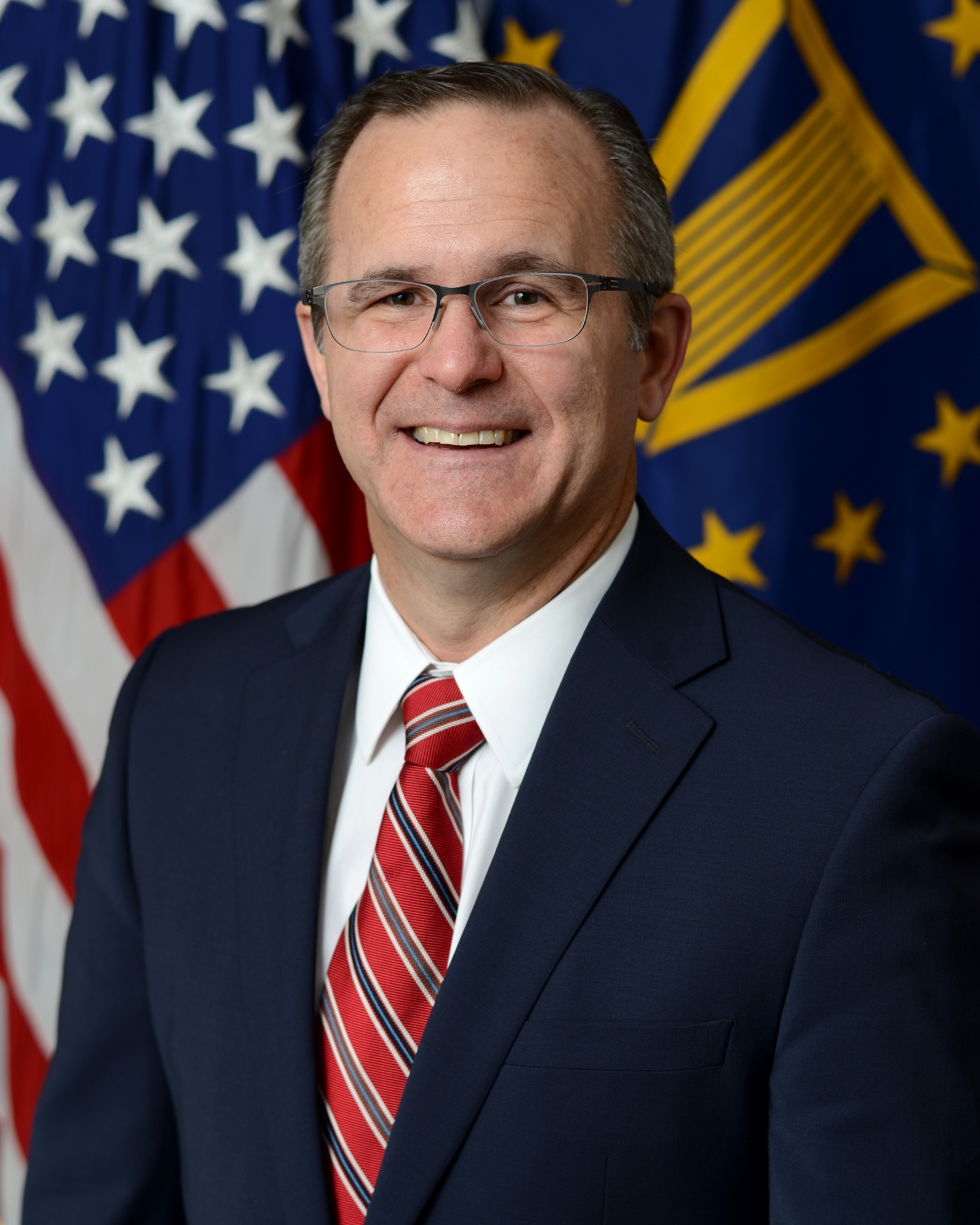
- Official portrait, 2025

Acting Assistant Secretary of Defense for Special Operations and Low-Intensity Conflict
- In office January 20, 2025 – August 25, 2025
- President: Donald Trump
- Preceded by: Christopher Maier
- Succeeded by: Derrick Anderson

Personal details
- Born: Colby C. Jenkins Roosevelt, Utah, U.S.
- Party: Republican

Military service
- Allegiance: United States
- Branch/service: United States Army
- Years of service: 2000-2011
- Rank: Colonel
- Unit: United States Army Special Forces

Colby Jenkins is an American official of the United States Department of Defense who served as acting Assistant Secretary of Defense for Special Operations and Low-Intensity Conflict from January to August 2025. He was a candidate in the Republican primary for Utah's 2nd congressional district in 2024, narrowly losing to incumbent Celeste Maloy.

== Early life and education ==
Jenkins was born and raised in Roosevelt, Utah. He is a graduate of the United States Military Academy.

== Career ==
While serving in the Army for 11 years, Jenkins became a Green Beret. He went on to lead special forces teams in Afghanistan and South America.

Upon leaving active service, Jenkins joined the National Guard and began teaching at George Washington University. He later worked in the tech industry for Google.

Jenkins challenged incumbent Republican U.S. Representative Celeste Maloy in the 2024 election for Utah's 2nd congressional district. The race was so close that he requested a recount of the results. After the recount, it was confirmed that he lost to Maloy by 176 votes.

In January 2025, President Donald Trump appointed Jenkins as acting Assistant Secretary of Defense for Special Operations and Low-Intensity Conflict. He left office on August 25, 2025.
