= Averting Loss of Life and Injury by Expediting SIVs Act of 2021 =

- Long title: To amend the Afghan Allies Protection Act of 2009 to expedite the special immigrant visa process for certain Afghan allies, and for other purposes.
- Announced in: the 117th United States Congress
- Number of co-sponsors: 74

Legislative history
- Introduced in the House of Representatives as H.R. 3985 by Jason Crow (D–CO) on June 17, 2021; Committee consideration by United States House Committee on the Judiciary

The Averting Loss of Life and Injury by Expediting SIVs (ALLIES) Act is a bipartisan piece of legislation that would remove or revise some statutory requirements in the Special Immigrant Visa (SIV) process and designed to expedite the SIV process and increase the total number of visas available by several thousand.

== Provisions ==
In a press release, sponsor Jason Crow (D-CO) listed aims of the Act:

- Increase the SIV allotment by an additional 8,000 visas to cover all potentially eligible applicants and their families currently in the pipeline;
- Amend the credible threat requirement, removing the necessity for applicants to provide additional paperwork to establish a credible threat we know exists for applicants with verified U.S. government ties;
- Strengthen protections for surviving spouses and children, allowing them to retain eligibility if the primary SIV applicant dies before visa approval;
- Clarify eligibility for certain Afghans who worked for Non-Government Organizations (NGOs) under cooperative agreements and grants with the U.S. government, including those performing critical democracy, human rights, and governance work;
- Remove the requirement for International Security Assistance Force or Resolute Support Mission employment to be “sensitive and trusted”, expanding the field of qualified applicants; and
- Eliminate paperwork by giving the Department of Homeland Security the flexibility not to require a I-360 petition in cases where the State Department has already determined an applicant's eligibility through the Chief of Mission process.

== Legislative History ==
Congress	Short title	Bill number(s)	Date introduced	Sponsor(s)	# of cosponsors	Latest status
117th Congress	Averting Loss of Life and Injury by Expediting SIVs Act of 2021	H.R.3985	June 17, 2021	Jason Crow (D-CO)	140	Passed the House (407–16).

== Reactions ==
The Biden administration issued a Statement of Administration Policy on the ALLIES Act, stating, “This legislation supports the President’s goal of ensuring the United States meets our commitments to those who served with us in Afghanistan… H.R. 3985 will assist in our efforts to streamline the application process by removing or revising some statutory requirements the Administration has found to be unnecessary and burdensome, while maintaining appropriate security vetting, and by increasing the total number of visas available to help meet the demand. These changes...are critical to expediting the application process and helping us get more Afghan partners through the process and into safety.”

The ALLIES Act has the support of high-ranking national security, defense, and foreign policy individuals, including former secretary of state Madeleine Albright, former secretaries of defense Robert Gates and Chuck Hagel, former chairman of the Joint Chiefs of Staff retired admiral Michael Mullen, former national security advisors Stephen J. Hadley and retired lieutenant general H. R. McMaster.

The ALLIES Act has also been endorsed by The American Legion, No One Left Behind, The National Immigration Forum, Union Veterans Council, VoteVets, Human Rights First, Vets for American Ideals, Enlisted Association of the National Guard of the United States (EANGUS), Military Chaplains Association of the United States of America (MCA), Military Order of the Purple Heart (MOPH), Reserve Officers of America (ROA), Korean War Veterans Association, American Ex-Prisoners of War, Association of Wartime Allies, Lutheran Immigration and Refugee Service (LIRS), and Association of the U.S. Army (AUSA).

== See also ==
- Operation Allies Refuge
- 2021 evacuation from Afghanistan
- Withdrawal of United States troops from Afghanistan (2020–2021)
