= United States Autonomous Warfare Command =

Planned U.S. military command

- Logo of the planned United States Autonomous Warfare Command
- Founded: In development
- Country: United States
- Type: Unified combatant command
- Role: Functional combatant command
- Part of: United States Department of Defense
- Nicknames: USAUTOWARCOM, AUTOWARCOM

Commanders
- Current commander: Mr. Owen West (SES)
- Deputy: Senior Chief Petty Officer Max Strasiser, USN

United States Autonomous Warfare Command (USAUTOWARCOM (Note: Also written AutoWarCom)) is a planned functional unified combatant command (UCC) of the United States Department of Defense intended to lead the employment of unmanned and autonomous weapons, robots, and artificial intelligence systems of the United States Armed Forces. The command would be the 12th UCC within the Department of Defense.

In a September 30, 2026 address at Marine Corps Base Quantico, Virginia, Secretary of Defense Pete Hegseth announced the creation of the command, stating that it would have "service-like authorities", and be established as a four-star functional combatant command by October 1, 2027. Hegseth's announcement stated that in the interim, the Direct Reporting Portfolio Manager for Unmanned Systems (DRPM-UxS) would lead the transitional organization under the new name Project Agincourt. Led by Owen West and Navy SEAL senior chief petty officer Max Strasiser, the organization is responsible for planning and building out the future command. Hegseth stated that the Department would soon announce a four-star general to take command.

The command's authorizing legislation, first announced in Spring 2026, is being considered in the U.S. Senate and is a part of the draft National Defense Authorization Act for Fiscal Year 2027. The decision to introduce a new Combatant Command, rather than a new service branch or other approaches, was reportedly the consensus decision of the Senate Armed Services Committee. The legislation passed the House of Representatives in July.

The proposed command would be the world's third large scale military organization devoted to unmanned warfare since the outbreak of the War in Ukraine. Ukraine introduced its Unmanned Systems Forces as a separate military branch in 2024, and Russia did the same with its Unmanned Systems Forces in 2025.

== See also ==
- Unmanned Systems Forces of Ukraine
- Unmanned Systems Forces of Russia
