= Michael D. Lumpkin =

American government official (born 1964)

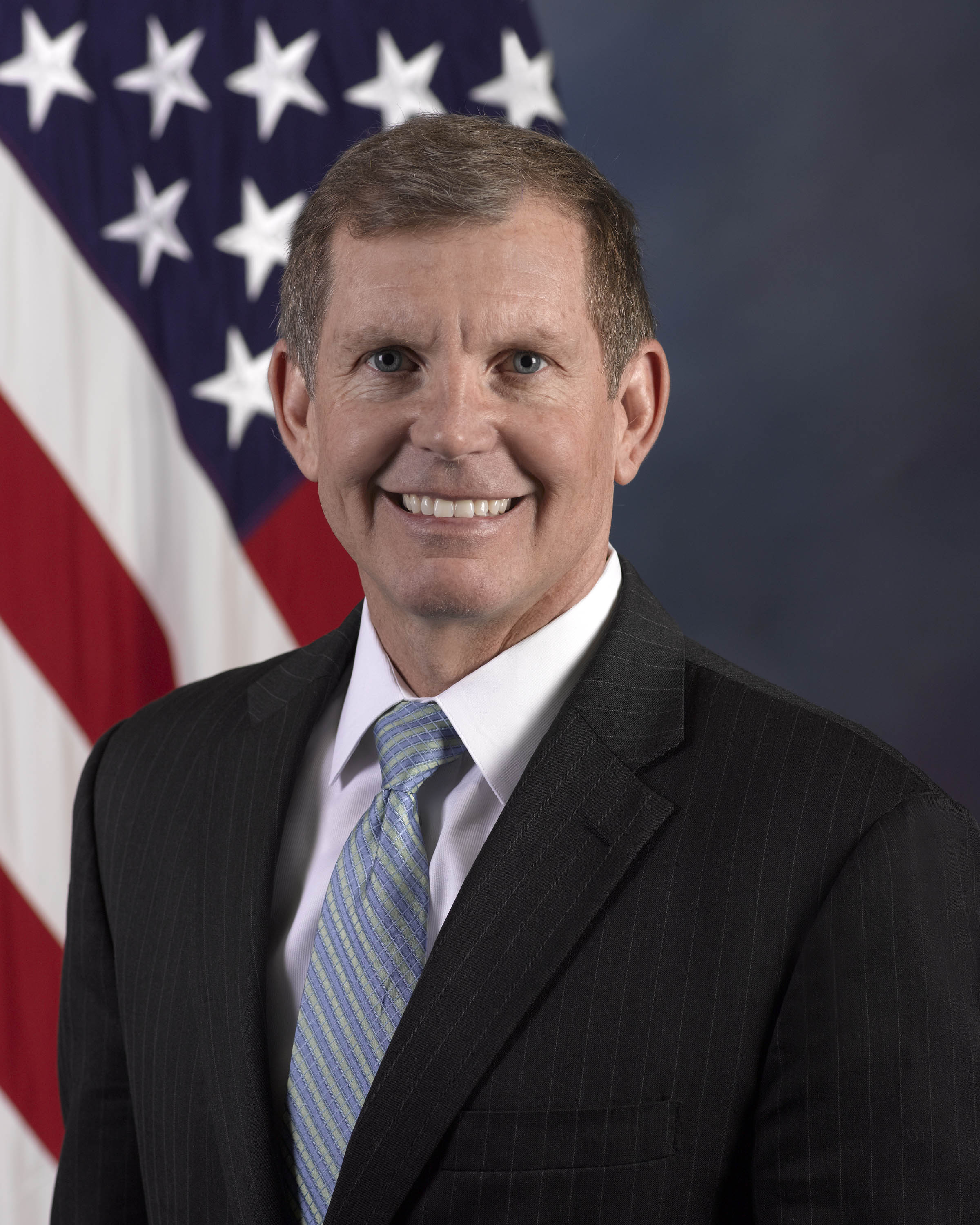

Acting Under Secretary of Defense for Policy
- In office January 9, 2014 – June 23, 2014
- President: Barack Obama
- Preceded by: James N. Miller
- Succeeded by: Christine Wormuth

Assistant Secretary of Defense for Special Operations and Low-Intensity Conflict
- In office November 19, 2013 – July 26, 2015
- President: Barack Obama
- Preceded by: Michael A. Sheehan
- Succeeded by: Owen West
- In office Acting: March 18, 2011 – December 19, 2011
- President: Barack Obama
- Preceded by: Michael Vickers
- Succeeded by: Michael A. Sheehan

Personal details
- Born: Michael David Lumpkin; October 14, 1964 (age 61) Oceanside, California, U.S.
- Party: Democrat
- Education: University of California, San Diego; Naval Postgraduate School
- Nickname: Mike

Military service
- Allegiance: United States
- Branch/service: United States Navy
- Years of service: 1986–2007
- Rank: Commander
- Unit: U.S. Navy SEALs

Michael D. Lumpkin (born October 14, 1964) is a former American Naval Officer and businessman who served as Chief of Staff at Immigration and Customs Enforcement (ICE) from November 2023-January 2025, Special Envoy and Coordinator of the Global Engagement Center at the U.S. Department of State from January 2016 to January 2017. From 2013 until 2016, he was the Assistant Secretary of Defense for Special Operations and Low-Intensity Conflict. During that time, he also served as the acting Under Secretary of Defense for Policy, the third-highest civilian job at the United States Department of Defense.

Lumpkin is considered an experienced crisis manager and turnaround expert. Notable assignments included overhauling the U.S. government efforts to disrupt extremist propaganda, and he led the DoD response to the Ebola crisis in West Africa, efforts to locate and return Sergeant Bowe Bergdahl, and the reorganization of the military's broken POW/MIA program.

As a Navy SEAL, Lumpkin served nine operational tours, one commanding a Team, in counter-insurgency and counter-narcotics operations around the world, including in Iraq, Afghanistan, the Horn of Africa, the Philippines, and Central and South America.

== Early life and education ==
Lumpkin was born in Oceanside, California, to his parents, David, and Jeri Lumpkin. They raised Lumpkin and his brother nearby in Vista, California. His father served in the U.S. Marine Corps, and his brother was career military non-commissioned officer who retired at the rank of chief master sergeant in the U.S. Air Force.

Lumpkin graduated from Vista High School in 1982 and from the University of California, San Diego in 1986, and subsequently earned his M.A. degree in National Security Affairs from the Naval Postgraduate School in Monterey, California. His thesis analyzed incidents of violence at sea between 1975 and 1995.

== Military career ==
After graduating from college, Lumpkin joined the U.S. Navy. Before becoming a Navy SEAL, Lumpkin did an abbreviated tour on USS Vancouver, where he qualified as a surface warfare officer. Lumpkin transferred to Naval Amphibious Base Coronado and subsequently completed Basic Underwater Demolition/SEAL (BUD/S) training with class 162 in 1989. Following SEAL Tactical Training (STT) and completion of six month probationary period, he received the 1130 designator as a Naval Special Warfare Officer, entitled to wear the Special Warfare insignia. He began his SEAL career with SEAL Team FOUR taking part in counter-narcotics operations in Latin America, mainly operated out of Panama. During this time, he held every leadership position from a squad leader, platoon commander to commanding officer, and he was formally recognized by the Armed Forces Preparedness Association for his Outstanding Contributions to National Security.

Immediately after the attacks of September 11, 2001, he was assigned as the officer in charge of all West Coast SEAL Teams' training and readiness. The teams he trained took part in the invasions of both Afghanistan and Iraq while sustaining zero casualties.

During Operation Iraqi Freedom, Lumpkin served as deputy commander of the Joint Special Operations Task Force for the Arabian Peninsula. He then served as the deputy commander of all special operations in Iraq. In that role, he oversaw the daily operations of more than 2,000 special operators, and activities at six high-value target interrogation facilities.

Lumpkin returned from Iraq for his final military assignment, working as a liaison to the U.S. Congress on policy and funding issues to support U.S. Special Operations Forces. The U.S. Department of Defense recognizes him as a specialist in both the Western Hemisphere and Special Operations/Low Intensity Conflict.

== Government service ==
Lumpkin retired from the United States Navy in 2007.

In 2010, Lumpkin began serving as both senior advisor to the secretary and deputy chief of staff for operations at the United States Department of Veterans Affairs. During that time, Secretary Eric Shinseki put Lumpkin in charge of implementing Family Caregiver legislation, passed in 2010, to better support families caring for post-9/11 Veterans.

In April 2011, Lumpkin moved over to The Pentagon, where he was sworn in as the Principal Deputy Assistant Secretary of Defense for Special Operations and Low-Intensity Conflict (SO/LIC).

He then served as the special assistant to Secretary of Defense Chuck Hagel. During that time, Secretary Hagel assigned Lumpkin with overseeing the reorganization of the then-broken POW/MIA accounting program. In the fall of 2013, President Obama nominated Lumpkin to be Assistant Secretary of Defense for SO/LIC. The U.S. Senate confirmed his nomination on December 2, 2013.

As the assistant secretary for SO/LIC, he was responsible for oversight of all special operations and low-intensity conflict activities, including counterterrorism; direct action; special reconnaissance; embassy security, peacekeeping operations, and counter-proliferation of WMD.

While he was the assistant secretary, Lumpkin served as the Acting Under Secretary of Defense for Policy. He was also asked to lead DoD's response to the Ebola crisis in West Africa, and efforts to return Sergeant Bowe Bergdahl from the Taliban.

In January 2016, President Obama asked Lumpkin to overhaul the U.S. government's efforts to counter the propaganda of violent extremist organizations abroad such as the Islamic State in Iraq and the Levant. He was appointed the special envoy and coordinator of the Global Engagement Center, an interagency organization that leverages the private sector and new data analytics tools to disrupt extremist violent propaganda.

In April 2022, Lumpkin was appointed by the Senate Armed Services Committee to serve as a member of the Afghanistan War Commission, a bipartisan commission designed to study the entirety of U.S. military operations in Afghanistan from 2001 to 2021.

== Politics ==
- Self-proclaimed "fiscal conservative".
- Advocate of personal responsibility.
- Gun owner.

== Private sector work ==
Lumpkin has significant business experience which he accumulated when not in government service. His previous positions include director of business development at ATI, Chief Executive Officer at Industrial Security Alliance Partners, and Vice President for Human Performance at Leidos. Lumpkin became President of Amida Technology Solutions, a data interoperability consultancy specializing in health IT advisory and implementation, in 2021.

== Awards ==
In addition to his over 40 awards and citations as a naval officer in both peace and combat, Lumpkin has on two occasions been awarded the Department of Defense Medal for Distinguished Public Service, the DoD's highest civilian medal. He has also twice been awarded the Secretary of Defense Medal for Outstanding Public Service, as well as the Secretary of Defense Award for Excellence.
