= Christopher Maier =

American government official

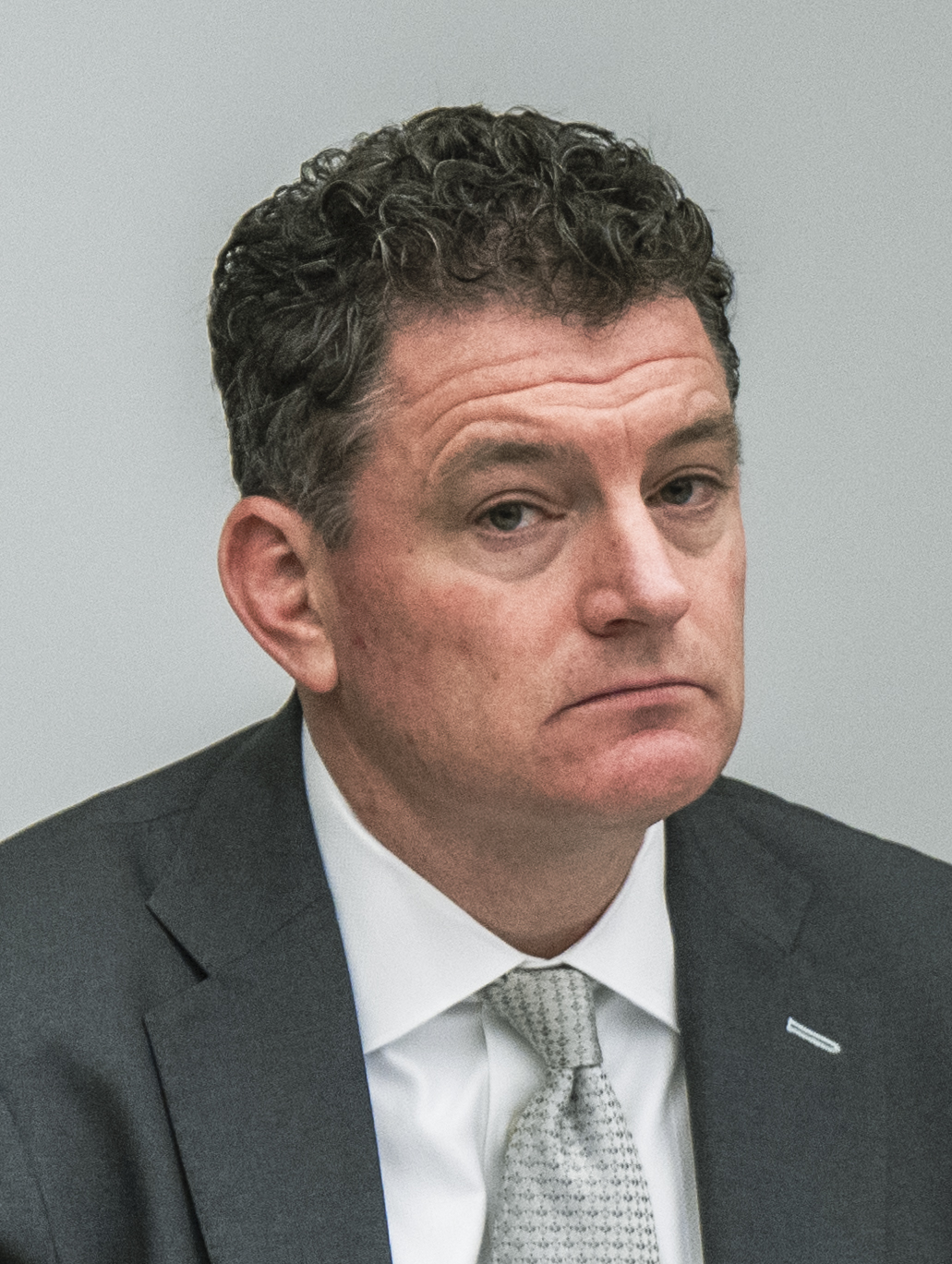
- Christopher Maier at NATO Headquarters in Belgium on October 17, 2024

Assistant Secretary of Defense for Special Operations and Low-Intensity Conflict
- In office August 12, 2021 – January 20, 2025
- President: Joe Biden
- Preceded by: Owen West
- Succeeded by: Colby Jenkins (acting); Derrick Anderson

Personal details
- Born: Christopher Paul Maier

Military service
- Allegiance: United States
- Branch/service: United States Air Force
- Unit: Air National Guard

Christopher Paul Maier is an American government official who served as the Assistant Secretary of Defense for Special Operations and Low-Intensity Conflict from 2021 to 2025. He previously served as the Principal Deputy Assistant Secretary of Defense for Special Operations and Low-Intensity Conflict, director of the Department of Defense's Defeat-ISIS Task Force from 2017 to 2020, and Deputy Assistant Secretary of Defense for Special Operations and Combating Terrorism from 2015 to 2017. After leaving government in 2025, he became a non-resident senior adviser at the Center for Strategic and International Studies (CSIS).

== Early life and education ==
Originally from California, Maier is the oldest of seven children, and his father worked as a civilian employee for the United States Navy. Maier earned degrees from the University of California, Berkeley and The Fletcher School at Tufts University. Before joining the federal government, he worked for more than five years as a strategy and management consultant to commercial, government, and nonprofit organizations.

== Military career ==
He serves as an officer in the Air National Guard.

== Government service ==
Maier began his government career as an intelligence analyst on Middle East and Africa issues. From March 2017 to November 2020 he led the Defeat-ISIS Task Force charged with integrating Department of Defense efforts in the campaign to achieve the enduring defeat of ISIS, until he was asked to resign by the Trump administration after the 2020 United States presidential election. In that role, he also directed the Secretary of Defense's leadership of the defense ministry components of the more than 80 members of the Global Coalition to Defeat ISIS. Maier was appointed as the Deputy Assistant Secretary of Defense for Special Operations and Combating Terrorism in the Obama administration, serving from July 2015 to September 2017. He previously served in different positions within the National Counterterrorism Center, including Senior Advisor to the Director, Chief of Strategic Assessments and Regional Planning, and Chief of Staff in the Directorate of Strategic Operational Planning. Maier was detailed from 2009 to 2013 to the National Security Council staff, where he authored the 2011 National Strategy for Counterterrorism.

=== Nomination as Assistant Secretary of Defense ===
In January 2021, it was reported that Maier would be brought back by the Biden administration as the acting principal deputy assistant secretary of defense for special operations and low-intensity conflict. In March 2021, testifying before the Senate as acting assistant secretary of defense for special operations alongside United States Special Operations Command head General Richard D. Clarke, Maier said the Pentagon was reviewing the Trump administration's withdrawal of U.S. forces from Somalia and saw likely downsides in cost and effectiveness. On April 23, 2021, President Joe Biden announced Maier as his nominee to be the Assistant Secretary of Defense for Special Operations and Low-Intensity Conflict. He testified before the Senate Committee on Armed Services on May 27, 2021, the committee advanced his nomination by voice vote on June 10, 2021, and he was confirmed by voice vote of the full Senate on August 7, 2021. He assumed office on August 12, 2021.

=== Tenure as Assistant Secretary of Defense ===
As Assistant Secretary of Defense for Special Operations and Low-Intensity Conflict, Maier advised the Secretary of Defense on special operations, irregular warfare, counterterrorism, counternarcotics, and information operations policy, and exercised civilian administrative oversight over United States Special Operations Command's organize, train, and equip functions. During his tenure, he focused on shifting special operations forces from two decades of counterterrorism missions toward strategic competition with China and Russia while maintaining counterterrorism and crisis response capabilities. At the National Defense Industrial Association's SO/LIC Symposium in November 2022, Maier said special operations forces still lacked "a voice at the table in the Pentagon" and needed to define their role beyond counterterrorism.

In May 2023, Maier said his office and U.S. Special Operations Command had jointly issued five-year capabilities and programming guidance for procurement and were developing a joint future operating concept. Speaking to the Defense Writers Group in August 2024, he voiced support for the Pentagon's Replicator unmanned systems initiative, saying special operations units could test smaller systems quickly as a proof of concept for scaling and that in a potential Indo-Pacific conflict, special operations forces would support the joint force, in contrast to the counterterrorism era when the joint force largely supported special operations. At the same briefing, Maier said special operations forces were examining artificial intelligence and automation to help reduce civilian casualties in large-scale combat, and he argued for investing in non-tactical enabler roles such as cyber, logistics, and psychological operations amid proposed Army cuts of up to 3,000 special operations positions. Speaking at a Center for a New American Security event in December 2024 as outgoing assistant secretary, he said special operations forces had expanded work in competition and crisis phases preceding armed conflict and would focus future deterrence on regional "campaigning." He left office in 2025.

== Post-government career ==
After leaving the Pentagon, Maier became a non-resident senior adviser with the Warfare, Irregular Threats, and Terrorism Program at the Center for Strategic and International Studies. In November 2025, he participated in a conference on precision lethality and civilian harm mitigation convened by the University of Pennsylvania's Center for Ethics and the Rule of Law, Perry World House, and Georgetown University's Center on Ethics and the Legal Profession, which was later broadcast on Lawfare.
