= Nazanin Ash =

US refugee rights organization CEO

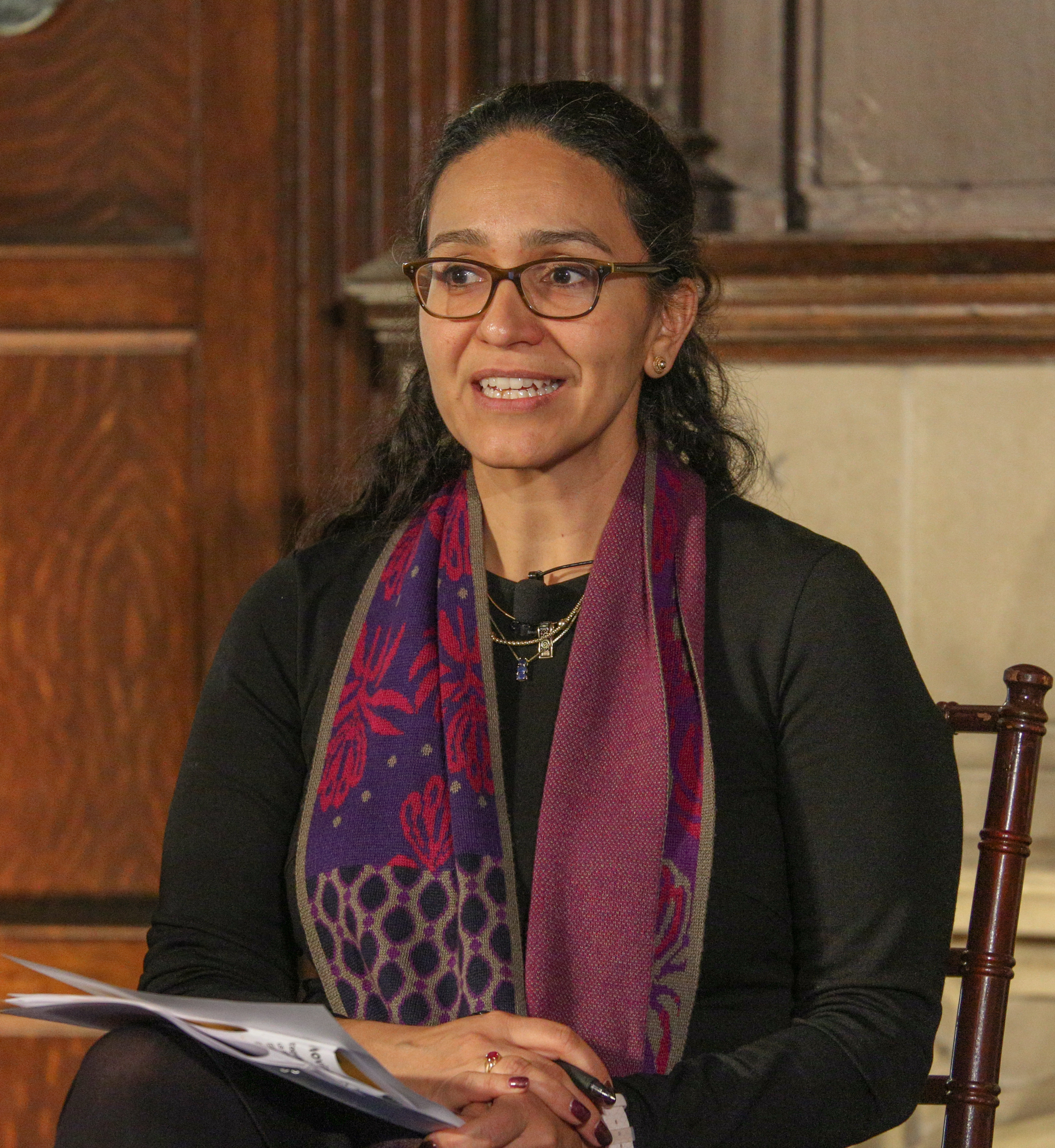
- Nazanin Ash at the Berkley Centre, November 6, 2019
- Born: Kansas, U.S.
- Education: Bryn Mawr College; Harvard Kennedy School
- Organization: Welcome.US
- Known for: Refugee advocacy

Nazanin Ash is the chief executive officer of Welcome.US and has previously worked in the US State Department of state in the Bureau of Near Eastern Affairs leading the Middle East Partnership Initiative and at the United States Agency for International Development (USAID) on international development and HIV/AIDS. Born to parents who left Iran, she is an advocate for American support for refugees, and was named in Washingtonian's list of the 500 most influential people in Washington, DC, in 2022.

== Early life and education ==
Ash was born in Kansas to parents from Iran. Both her parents emigrated to the United States as students, expecting to return home after her father completed his Ph.D., but decided not to go back to Iran following the 1979 Islamic Revolution.

She earned a bachelor's degree in political science from Bryn Mawr College, where she received the Hope Wearn Troxell Memorial Prize. She then pursued a master's degree in public policy from the John F. Kennedy School of Government at Harvard University where she was also a Sheldon Fellow, an Imagitas Fellow, and a Public Service Fellow. In 2003, she was one of two alumni awarded the Kennedy School's Rising Star Award.

== Career ==
From 2002 to 2003, Ash worked with ActionAid Kenya as its program officer for HIV/AIDS. In 2003, she was appointed by President George W. Bush as one of twelve White House Fellows.

Ash worked as the Chief of Staff for Randall L. Tobias when he served as the United States Global AIDS Coordinator, and at United States Agency for International Development during the Presidency of George W. Bush. She also worked as the Deputy Assistant Secretary, at the Bureau of Near Eastern Affairs during the Presidency of Barack Obama. In 2021, she was the Vice President of Global Policy and Advocacy at the International Rescue Committee. She was also a visiting policy fellow at the Center for Global Development, where she focused on aid effectiveness and political and economic reform in the Middle East.

In September 2021, Ash was appointed CEO of Welcome.US, which was founded to help resettle 100,000 Afghan refugees within a period of six months. Welcome.US advocates reform of the US asylum system with an emphasis on the role of non-governmental organizations in "building civil society partnerships on behalf of Afghan newcomers".

== Advocacy ==
Ash has also been vocal about the Ongoing Yemeni crisis. She has also stated that the United States should support refugee-hosting countries in the Middle East.

In April 2022, Ash was a key speaker at Accenture's 2022 Women's Leadership Forum alongside Amal Clooney, Judith McKenna, Julie Sweet, amongst others.

Ash was named to Washingtonian's list of the 500 most influential people in Washington, DC, in 2022.

== Selected publications ==
- Cindy Huang, Nazanin Ash, Katelyn Gough, and Lauren Post. Designing refugee compacts: lessons from Jordan. Forced Migration Review, Issue 57, pages 52–53, January 2018.
- Cindy Huang and Nazanin Ash. Using the Compact Model to Support Host States and Refugee Self-reliance, CIGI online, 2018.
- Nazanin Ash and Allison Grossman. Modernizing US Security and Development Assistance in the Middle East, Center for Global Development, 2015.
