= Bing West =

American writer and governmental official

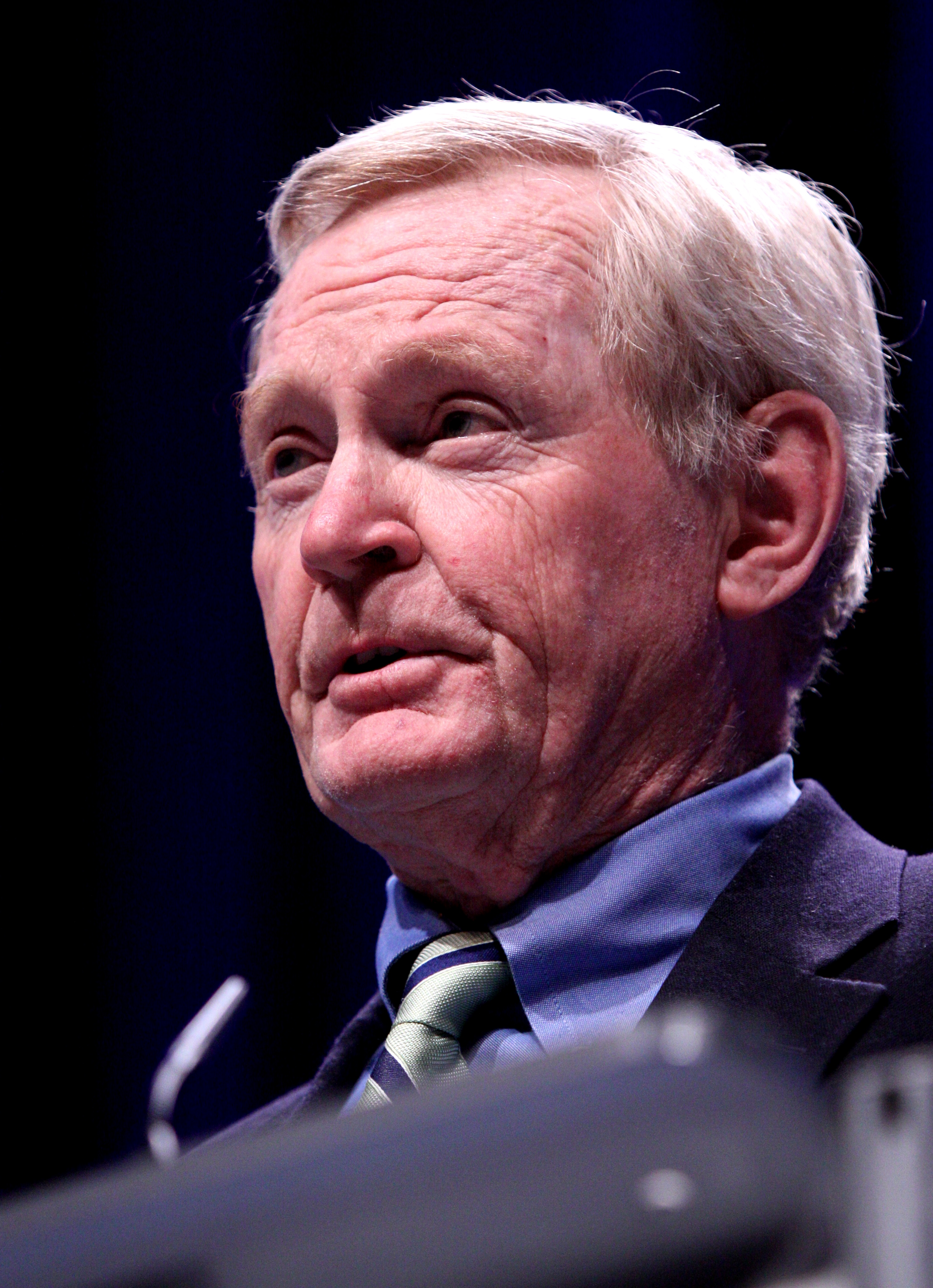
- West at CPAC in 2011

Assistant Secretary of Defense for International Security Affairs
- In office April 4, 1981 – April 1, 1983
- President: Ronald Reagan
- Preceded by: David E. McGiffert
- Succeeded by: Richard Armitage

Personal details
- Born: Francis J. West Jr. May 2, 1940 (age 86) Boston, Massachusetts, U.S.
- Spouse: Elizabeth
- Children: 4 (including Owen)
- Education: Georgetown University (B.A.); Princeton University (M.A.)

Military service
- Allegiance: United States of America
- Branch/service: United States Marine Corps
- Years of service: 1962–1968 (active); 1968–1998 (reserve)
- Rank: Captain (active); Colonel (reserve)
- Battles/wars: Vietnam War

Francis J. "Bing" West Jr. (born May 2, 1940) is an American author, Marine combat veteran and former Assistant Secretary of Defense for International Security Affairs during the Reagan Administration.

West writes about the military, warfighting, and counterinsurgency. In the Vietnam War, he fought in major operations and conducted over a hundred combat patrols in 1966–1968. For the United States Marine Corps, he wrote the training manual Small Unit Action in Vietnam, describing how to fight in close combat. As an analyst at the RAND Corporation, he wrote a half dozen detailed monographs about fighting against an insurgency. Later, as Assistant Secretary of Defense, he dealt with the insurgencies in El Salvador. From 2003 through 2008, he made 16 extended trips to Iraq, going on patrols and writing three books and numerous articles about the war. From 2007 through 2011, he made numerous trips to embed in Afghanistan.

== Life and career ==
West is from the Massachusetts communities of Dorchester, Boston, Milton and Scituate. He is a graduate of Georgetown University (BA) and Princeton University (MA), where he was a Woodrow Wilson Fellow.

West was an infantry officer in the Marine Corps during the Vietnam War. He led the mortar platoon of 2nd Battalion, 9th Marines. Later, he led a Combined Action Platoon (CAP) that protected Binh Nghia village in Quảng Trị province. He was also a member of the Marine Force Reconnaissance team that initiated "Operation Stingray": small unit attacks behind enemy lines. He authored a study at the RAND Corporation entitled "The Strike Teams: Tactical Performance and Strategic Potential". This paper was the featured event at the 1970 Department of Defense Counterinsurgency Research and Development Symposium. The RAND Military Systems Simulations Group implemented a classified model of West's concept. This doctrinal innovation was directly opposed by Military Assistance Command Vietnam (MACV), which favored the Army's concept of Air-Mobility "Fire and Thunder Operations". By way of rebuttal, West wrote The Village, chronicling his experiences leading the CAP. The book became a classic of practical counterinsurgency and has been on the Marine Corps Commandant's Required Reading List for five decades.

In a December 1969 report on pacification co-written with Charlie Benoit "Pacification: View from the Provinces—Part III," they concluded that pacification had been achieved through often indiscriminate firepower and rural depopulation, resulting in occupation rather than pacification. While Vietcong (VC) losses in the Tet Offensive and subsequent operations had severely attrited the VC and their support among the peasantry, the corruption of the South Vietnamese government and military meant that support for the government was not increasing.

West served as Assistant Secretary of Defense for International Security Affairs in the Ronald Reagan administration, and chaired the United States Security Commissions with El Salvador, Morocco, Tunisia, Egypt, Israel, Jordan, Pakistan, South Korea, and Japan.

Among other awards, West is the recipient of the Department of Defense Distinguished Public Service Medal, the Department of the Navy Distinguished Civilian Service Medal, and Tunisia's Medaille de Liberté. A member of the Council on Foreign Relations and the Infantry Order of St. Crispin, he appears frequently on C-SPAN and The News Hour on PBS. He embedded with dozens of platoons in Iraq and Afghanistan between 2003 and 2012.

=== Writing ===
West is the author of a dozen books about America's lost wars in Vietnam, Iraq and Afghanistan. His latest is Cat 5: the 2033 War. He argues that hubris will result in a debt crisis by 2033, enabling China to squeeze Taiwan. His 2019 collaboration with Marine General Jim Mattis, entitled Call Sign Chaos: Learning to Lead, was the #1 New York Times Bestseller. A prior book, written with retired Marine Major General Ray L. Smith, The March Up, was awarded the Marine Corps Heritage Foundation's General Wallace M. Greene Jr. Award for non-fiction, as well as the William E. Colby Award for military history. The Veterans of Foreign Wars presented West with their National Media Award in 2005, after he wrote the book No True Glory: A Frontline Account of the Battle for Fallujah. His book The Strongest Tribe is a history of the Iraq War that was a New York Times Best Seller and was ranked by Foreign Affairs magazine as #7 among the top foreign policy books of 2009. Into the Fire ranked #8 on the New York Times Best Seller List.

In The Strongest Tribe about counterinsurgency lessons, West argued that the doctrine of nation-building and winning hearts and minds by economic development was based on Western liberal theory rather than the realities of battle. West criticized those extolling "non-kinetic COIN." He believes that warriors, not the people, defeat warriors, and that America's mistake in both Iraq and Afghanistan was to concede authority to appoint and to remove for cause military and police officers. He believes American policymakers tried to do too much with too little in too short a time. Because America was so dominant after WWII, our presidents, policymakers and Congress fought half-hearted wars and dole out staggering entitlements, with no consequence.

His articles have appeared in The Wall Street Journal, The New York Times, The Atlantic, National Review, and The Washington Post. He is a recipient of the Department of Defense Distinguished Public Service Medal (twice), the Marine Corps Heritage Award (thrice), the Goodpaster Prize for Military Scholarship, the Father Clyde E. Leonard Award, the Free Press Award, the Marine Corps Correspondents' Distinguished Performance Award, the Veterans of Foreign Wars' National Media Award and the Marine Corps Russell Award for Leadership.

=== Personal life ===
West lives with his wife, Elizabeth, in Newport, Rhode Island and Hilton Head, SC. He has two daughters and two sons (one of whom is Owen West). He has eight grandchildren.

== Books ==
- Bing West, Cat 5: the 2033 War, ISBN 979 -8-89565-652-5
- Bing West, The Last Platoon. ISBN 978-1-64293-673-5
- Bing West & Jim Mattis, Call Sign Chaos: Learning to Lead. (ISBN 978-0-8129-9683-8)
- Small Unit Action in Vietnam, Summer 1966. ISBN 0-405-00018-9.
- The Village. ISBN 0-7434-5757-9.
- Naval Forces and National Security. ISBN 0080355439.
- The Pepperdogs: a Novel. ISBN 0-7434-5643-2.
- The March Up: Taking Baghdad with the US Marines. ISBN 0-553-38269-1.
- No True Glory: a Front-line Account of the Battle of Fallujah. ISBN 0-553-80402-2.
- The Strongest Tribe: War, Politics, and the Endgame in Iraq (Random House, 2008) ISBN 1-4000-6701-4
- The Wrong War: Grit, Strategy, and the Way Out of Afghanistan ISBN 1-4000-6873-8.
- One Million Steps: A Marine Platoon at War. ISBN 9781493017324
- Into the Fire:a Firsthand Account of the Most Extraordinary Battle in the Afghan War ISBN 978-0-679-64544-3
