= Assistant Secretary of Defense for Special Operations and Low-Intensity Conflict =

American government civilian advisor

United States Assistant Secretary of Defense for Special Operations and Low-Intensity Conflict
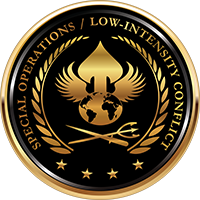
- Seal of the assistant secretary of defense for special operations and low-intensity conflict

- Flag of an assistant secretary of defense

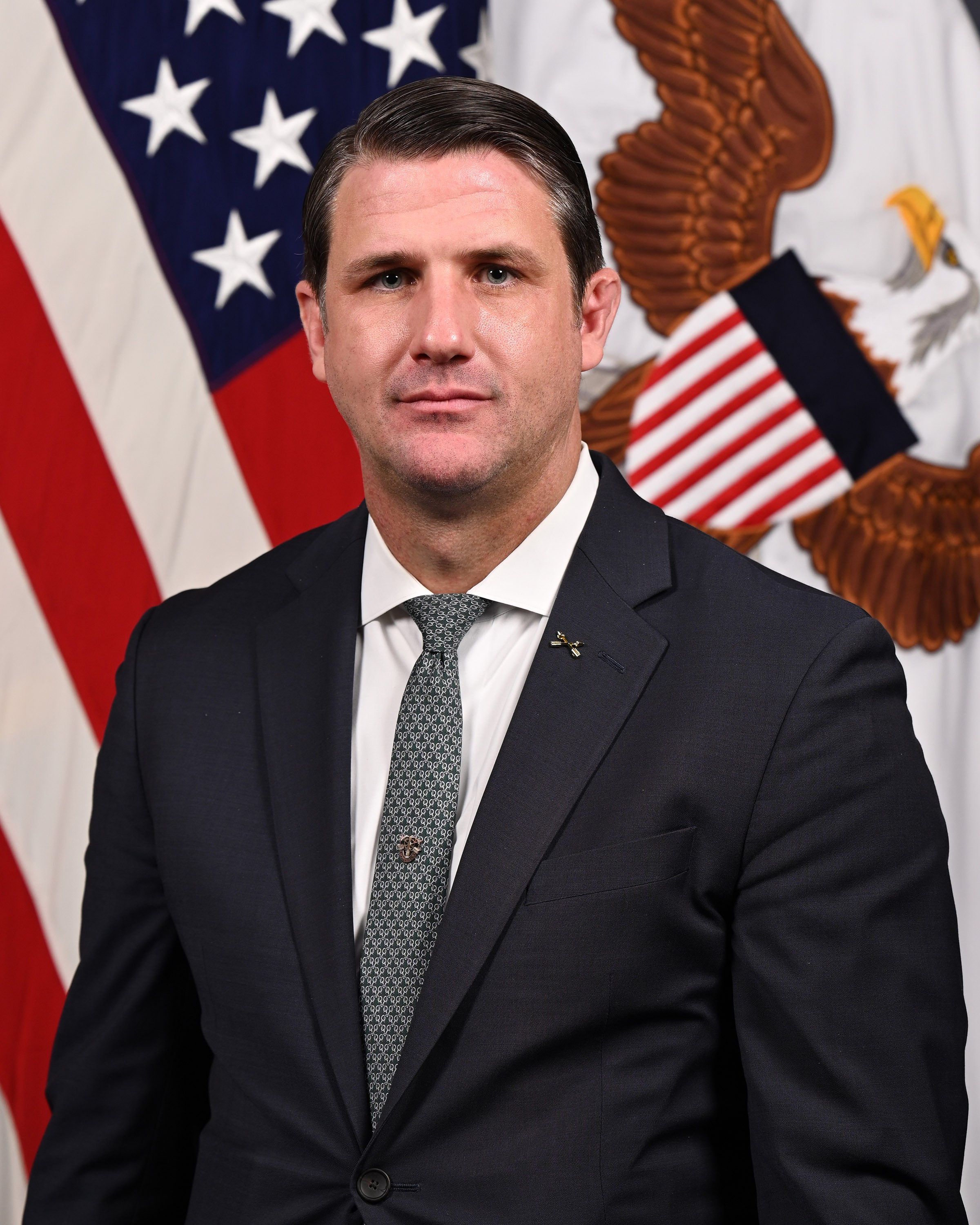
- Incumbent; Derrick Anderson since December 29, 2025
- United States Department of Defense
- Reports to: United States Secretary of Defense
- Appointer: The president; with Senate advice and consent
- Term length: Appointed
- Website: Official website

The assistant secretary of defense for special operations/low-intensity conflict or ASD(SO/LIC), is the principal civilian advisor to the secretary of defense on special operations and low-intensity conflict matters. Located within the office of the under secretary of defense for policy (USD(P)), the ASD(SO/LIC) is responsible primarily for the overall supervision (to include oversight of policy and resources) of special operations and low-intensity conflict activities. These activities, according to USSOCOM's 2007 Posture Statement, include counterterrorism; unconventional warfare; direct action; special reconnaissance; foreign internal defense; civil affairs, information operations, psychological operations, and counterproliferation of WMD. (Note: Section 167 of Title 10 USC provides a very similar but not identical list of SOF activities.)

In addition to policy oversight for special operations and stability operations capabilities, the ASD(SO/LIC) has policy oversight for strategic capabilities and force transformation and resources. This includes oversight of capability development to include general-purpose forces, space and information capabilities, nuclear and conventional strike capabilities, and missile defense. As such, the ASD(SO/LIC), after the secretary and deputy secretary, will be the principal official charged with oversight over all warfighting capabilities within the senior management of the Department of Defense. The ASD(SO/LIC) is considered part of the Office of the Secretary of Defense.

== Structure ==
This position was mandated by the National Defense Authorization Act for Fiscal Year 1987 (P.L. 99-661, passed 14 November 1986). The position was officially established on 4 January 1988, by Defense Directive 5138.3. The post's responsibilities for strategic capabilities and forces transformation were added as a result of USD(P) Eric Edelman's 2006 reorganization of the DoD policy office.

The ASD(SO/LIC) is supported in his/her work by three deputy assistant secretaries of defense:

- DASD, Special Operations and Combating Terrorism
- DASD, Partnership Strategy and Stability Operations
- DASD, Counternarcotics and Global Threats
- Executive Director for the Office of Information Operations Policy

In November 2020, Acting Secretary of Defense Christopher Miller announced that Christopher Maier, director of the wide ranging DoD Defeat-ISIS Task Force had resigned, and that the task-force director’s duties and responsibilities will be absorbed by the office of the ASD (SO/LIC) and regional staffs of the office of the under secretary of defense for policy.

== Officeholders ==
The table below includes both the various titles of this post over time, as well as all the holders of those offices.

Assistant Secretary of Defense (Special Operations/Low-Intensity Conflict)
| Name | Tenure | SecDef(s) served under | President(s) served under |
|---|---|---|---|
Assistant Secretary of Defense (Special Operations/Low Intensity Conflict)
| Charles S. Whitehouse | July 13, 1988 – July 12, 1989 | Frank C. Carlucci III; William H. Taft IV (Acting); Richard B. Cheney | Ronald Reagan; George H. W. Bush |
| Seth Cropsey (Acting) | July 13, 1989 – October 18, 1989 | Richard B. Cheney | George H. W. Bush |
| James R. Locher | October 19, 1989 – June 19, 1993 | Richard B. Cheney; Leslie Aspin, Jr. | George H. W. Bush; Bill Clinton |
| H. Allen Holmes | November 18, 1993 – April 30, 1999 | Les Aspin, Jr. William J. Perry; William S. Cohen | Bill Clinton |
| Brian E. Sheridan | May 7, 1999 – January 12, 2001 | William S. Cohen | Bill Clinton |
| Position vacant | 2001–2003 | Donald H. Rumsfeld | George W. Bush |
| Thomas W. O'Connell | July 23, 2003 – April 17, 2007 | Donald H. Rumsfeld; Robert M. Gates | George W. Bush |
Assistant Secretary of Defense (Special Operations/Low-Intensity Conflict & Interdependent Capabilities)
| Michael G. Vickers | July 23, 2007 – March 17, 2011 | Robert M. Gates | George W. Bush; Barack Obama |
| Michael D. Lumpkin (Acting) | March 18, 2011 – October 20, 2011 | Robert M. Gates; Leon Panetta | Barack Obama |
Assistant Secretary of Defense (Special Operations and Low-Intensity Conflict)
| Michael D. Lumpkin (Acting) | October 21, 2011 – December 19, 2011 | Robert M. Gates; Leon Panetta | Barack Obama |
| Michael A. Sheehan | December 20, 2011 – August 25, 2013 | Leon Panetta; Chuck Hagel | Barack Obama |
| Michael D. Lumpkin | November 19, 2013 – July 26, 2015 | Chuck Hagel | Barack Obama |
| Theresa M. Whelan (Acting) | July 26, 2015 – May 30, 2017 | Ash Carter; James Mattis | Barack Obama; Donald Trump |
| Caryn Hollis (Performing the Duties of) | May 30, 2017 – August 1, 2017 | James Mattis | Donald Trump |
| Mark E. Mitchell (Acting) | August 2, 2017 – December 20, 2017 | James Mattis | Donald Trump |
| Owen West | December 20, 2017 – June 22, 2019 | James Mattis | Donald Trump |
| Mark E. Mitchell (Acting) | June 23, 2019 – November 1, 2019 | Mark Esper | Donald Trump |
| Thomas A. Alexander (Acting) | November 2, 2019 – January 20, 2020 | Mark Esper | Donald Trump |
| Thomas A. Alexander (Performing the Duties of) | January 21, 2020 – June 18, 2020 | Mark Esper | Donald Trump |
| Christopher C. Miller (Performing the Duties of) | June 19, 2020 – August 10, 2020 | Mark Esper | Donald Trump |
| Ezra Cohen Watnick (Acting) | August 10, 2020 – November 10, 2020 | Mark Esper | Donald Trump |
| Joseph Tonon (Acting) | November 10, 2020 – January 20, 2021 | Christopher C. Miller (Acting) | Donald Trump |
| Joseph J. McMenamin (Acting) | January 20, 2021 – August 12, 2021 | Lloyd Austin | Joe Biden |
| Christopher Maier | August 12, 2021 – January 20, 2025 | Lloyd Austin | Joe Biden |
| Colby Jenkins (Acting) | January 20, 2025 – August 25, 2025 | Pete Hegseth | Donald Trump |
| Richard Tilley (Acting) | August 25, 2025 – December 29, 2025 | Pete Hegseth | Donald Trump |
| Derrick Anderson | December 29, 2025 – Present | Pete Hegseth | Donald Trump |
