= Michael A. Sheehan =

American author and former government official

Michael Sheehan

Assistant Secretary of Defense for Special Operations and Low-Intensity Conflict
- In office December 20, 2011 – August 25, 2013
- President: Barack Obama
- Preceded by: Michael G. Vickers
- Succeeded by: Michael D. Lumpkin

11th Coordinator for Counterterrorism
- In office December 14, 1998 – December 20, 2000; Acting: December 14, 1998 – August 9, 1999
- President: Bill Clinton
- Preceded by: Christopher W.S. Ross
- Succeeded by: Francis X. Taylor

Personal details
- Born: February 10, 1955 Red Bank, New Jersey, U.S.
- Died: July 30, 2018 (aged 63) Bethesda, Maryland, U.S.
- Education: United States Military Academy (BS); Georgetown University (MS); United States Army Command and General Staff College (MS)

Military service
- Allegiance: United States
- Branch/service: United States Army
- Rank: Colonel

Michael A. Sheehan (February 10, 1955 – July 30, 2018) was an American author and former government official and military officer. He was a Distinguished Chair at the U.S. Military Academy in West Point, New York and a terrorism analyst for NBC News.

== Education ==
Born in Red Bank, New Jersey, Sheehan was raised in Hazlet and graduated from Christian Brothers Academy in 1973 and the United States Military Academy (West Point) in 1977. Mr. Sheehan was the son of a school teacher and a civil engineer John and Janet Sheehan, the former of which also attended the United States Military Academy at West Point. Sheehan has a Master of Science in Foreign Service from the Georgetown University School of Foreign Service as well as one from the United States Army Command and General Staff College.

== Military career ==
He served as an officer in the infantry and Special Forces. He had several overseas assignments, as a commander of a "counter-terrorism" unit in Panama, a counterinsurgency advisor in El Salvador, an infantry company commander in Korea, and on peacekeeping duty in Somalia and Haiti. Also while on active duty, he served in the White House on the National Security Council staff for Presidents George H. W. Bush and Bill Clinton.

== Department of State ==
In 1998, he was appointed Coordinator for Counterterrorism with the rank and status of Ambassador-at-Large at the United States Department of State and was confirmed by the United States Senate for this position in 1999. Following an assignment as Assistant-Secretary-General at the United Nations in the Department of Peacekeeping Operations (2001 to 2003), Sheehan served as Deputy Commissioner of Counter Terrorism for the New York City Police Department until May 2006.

According to General Daniel P. Bolger's book Why We Lost, at an acrimonious meeting in the Clinton White House, Mr. Sheehan asked the members of the Armed Forces present: "Does Al Qaeda have to hit the Pentagon to get your attention?"

In an interview with a local TV channel, former head of the ISI, General Ziauddin Butt said that US did not intend to capture Osama Bin Laden. General said: "Of the officers US sent to probe for him (Osama Bin Laden), one was a retired major named Sheehan who was extremely unprofessional. At night when we were supposed to discuss the matter, he was so drunk that we had no chance of discussing this matter".

== Life after diplomatic service ==
Sheehan then served as president and co-founder of Lexington Security Group, an international consulting firm that specializes in providing international law enforcement, internal security, and national defense organizations with strategic guidance, unit training, and individual mentoring to manage emerging security challenges. He was a partner in Torch Hill Investment Partners, a private equity group in New York City that specializes in the defense, intelligence and security sectors. He was also a terrorism analyst for NBC News and a fellow at New York University's Center on Law and Security.

== Return to federal service ==
The White House nominated Sheehan to become Assistant Secretary of Defense for Special Operations and Low Intensity Conflict on November 1, 2011. The U.S. Senate Senate Armed Services Committee held his confirmation hearing on November 17, 2011, and he was confirmed by a voice vote on December 17, 2011.

== Personal life and death ==
Sheehan was married to Maria Eitel, with whom he had a daughter, and later had a son from his second marriage.

Sheehan died in Bethesda, Maryland from multiple myeloma on July 30, 2018, aged 63.

== Author ==
Sheehan is the author of the book Crush the Cell: How to Defeat Terrorism Without Terrorizing Ourselves ISBN 978-0-307-38217-7

Diplomatic posts
Preceded by Christopher W.S. Ross	Coordinator for Counterterrorism; 1998–2000; Acting: 1998–1999	Succeeded by Francis X. Taylor
Political offices
Preceded by Michael D. Lumpkin; Acting	Assistant Secretary of Defense for Special Operations and Low-Intensity Conflict; 2011–2013	Succeeded by Michael D. Lumpkin
