= Owen West =

American businessman and government official (born 1969)

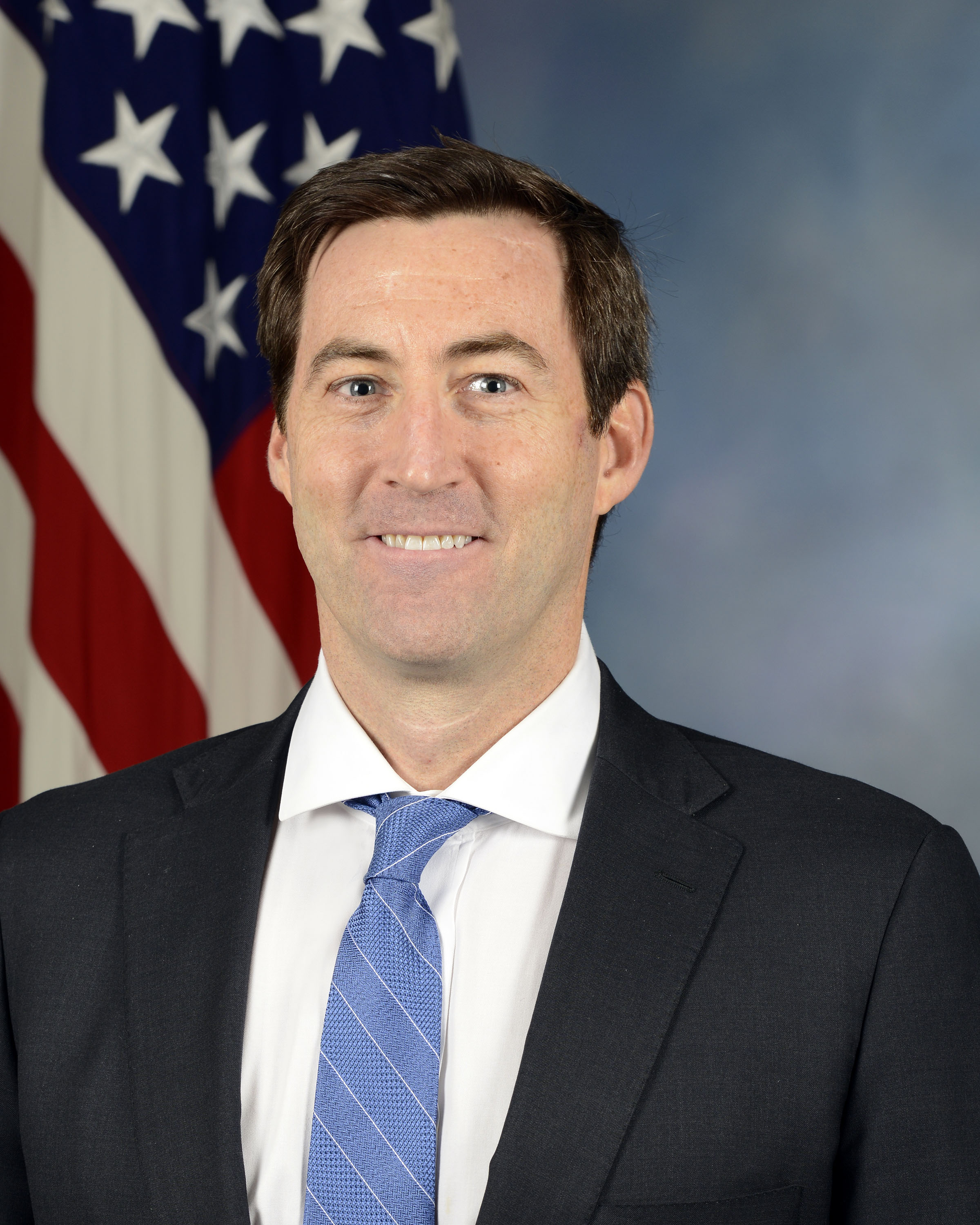

Assistant Secretary of Defense for Special Operations and Low-Intensity Conflict
- In office December 20, 2017 – June 22, 2019
- President: Donald Trump
- Preceded by: Michael D. Lumpkin
- Succeeded by: Christopher Maier

Personal details
- Born: Owen O'Driscoll West; September 24, 1969 (age 57) Washington, D.C., U.S.
- Education: Harvard University (BA); Stanford University (MBA)
- Awards: W.Y. Boyd Literary Award for Excellence in Military Fiction

Military service
- Allegiance: United States of America
- Branch/service: United States Marine Corps
- Years of service: 1991–1996, 2003, 2005, 2006–2007
- Rank: Major
- Unit: 1st Battalion, 1st Marines; 1st Reconnaissance Company; 1st Force Reconnaissance Company; 4th ANGLICO; Military Transition Team 3-3-1
- Battles/wars: Iraq War

Owen West is a United States Marine, banker, and author who serves as the Director of the Defense Innovation Unit. West served as Department of Government Efficiency team lead at the United States Department of Defense in 2025, and as Assistant Secretary of Defense for Special Operations and Low-Intensity Conflict from 2017 to 2019. His June 6, 2017, nomination for this post was confirmed by a 74–23 vote of the U.S. Senate on December 18, 2017. West submitted his resignation in June 2019.

== Early life and education ==
Owen West was born in Washington, D.C., in 1969 and attended St. Paul's School in Concord, New Hampshire. He received a B.A. from Harvard University in 1991 and an MBA from Stanford Graduate School of Business in 1998. West was an all-Ivy League heavyweight rower at Harvard, and a 2nd team All-American.

== Military service ==
In 1991, West was commissioned a second lieutenant after graduating from Harvard as a ROTC midshipman. He served for six years as an infantry platoon commander and a reconnaissance platoon commander. In 2003, he returned to active duty as the fires officer for 1st Force Reconnaissance Company during the Iraq invasion. In 2004, he embedded with 1st Reconnaissance Battalion outside Fallujah as a reporter. In 2006–2007, West served as the team leader for a mixed Army-Marine team advising Iraqi Battalion 3-3-1 in Habbaniyah, Anbar Province, Iraq.

== Career ==
=== Goldman Sachs ===
West interned for J. Aron, the commodities trading unit of Goldman Sachs, in 1997 and joined them full-time as a natural gas futures trader in 1998. In his 19 years at Goldman, he has taken four leaves-of-absence: to race in the 2000 Eco Challenge, to attempt the North Face of Mount Everest in 2001, and to join the Marines in Iraq in 2003 and 2006–2007. At Goldman, West greatly expanded the physical footprint of natural gas trading, founded the firm's veteran's network, and co-founded its veteran internship program. He was named a partner in 2014. He was formerly global head of natural gas trading and co-head of global power trading at Goldman Sachs.

Business Insider called West "the most badass banker on Wall Street."

=== Post-Goldman Sachs ===
In August 2021, West was named as a member of American facial recognition company Clearview AI's advisory board. West joined the board of No One Left Behind, dedicated to rescuing Iraqi and Afghan interpreters and their families, in 2019.

== Author ==
West is the author of three Simon & Schuster books and several dozen articles on military affairs and adventure sports. His first novel, Sharkman Six, won the 2001 W.Y. Boyd Literary Award for Excellence in Military Fiction. His third book, The Snake Eaters, was named one of the "best books on today's wars" by Newsweek. Dave Grossman, the bestselling author of On Killing, called it "The single most important book to come out of the wars in Iraq and Afghanistan." West donated the advance and net proceeds of this book to the Marine Corps Scholarship Foundation.

== Personal life ==
He is the son of Bing West, a former Marine Colonel and Vietnam veteran who served as Assistant Secretary of Defense for International Security Affairs during Ronald Reagan's presidency.

West has been the director of the Positive Coaching Alliance, a director of the Marine Corps Scholarship Foundation, and a member of the Council on Foreign Relations.

=== Endurance sports ===
He began his endurance racing career while in the Marines, representing the U.S. six times in the 500 km Eco-Challenge, "the world’s toughest expedition race," finishing as high as second place. He raced with Marines, female firefighters, and as the sole male on Team Playboy XTreme.

In 2001, West attempted to climb Mount Everest via the challenging North Face, turning back above 28,000 feet.

He has completed 100-mile marathons, several Ironman triathlons, and in 2015 was the U.S. national 40+ triathlon champion in the Clydesdale (220 lbs.+) division. West is an avid spearfisherman.
