= Joseph J. McMenamin =

United States Marine Corps general

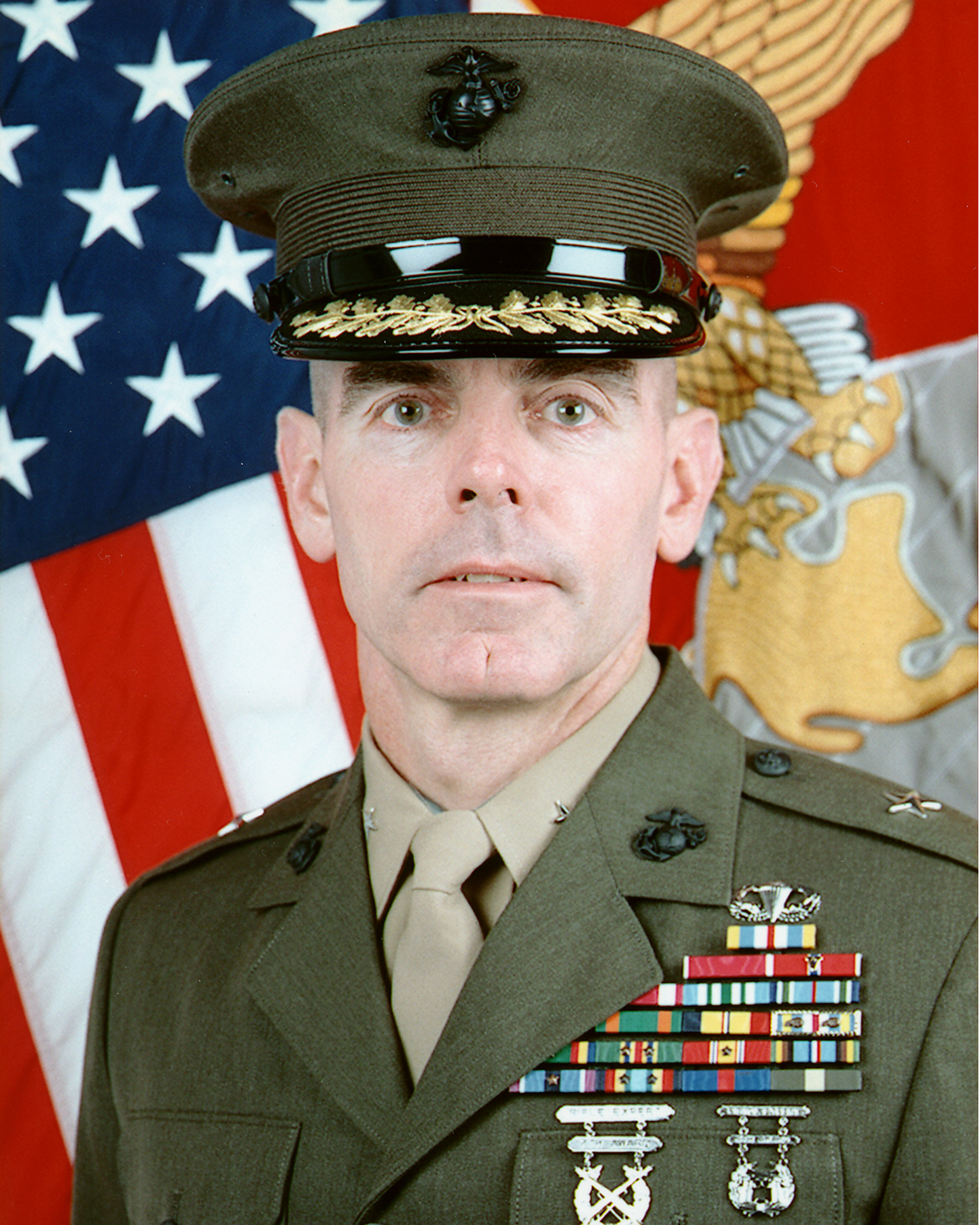
- Brigadier General McMenamin
- Military career
- Allegiance: United States of America
- Branch: United States Marine Corps
- Service years: 1974–2006
- Rank: Brigadier general
- Commands: 2nd LAR Bn; 6th Marine Corps District; Marine Corps Recruit Depot Parris Island
- Awards: Defense Superior Service Medal (2); Legion of Merit; Bronze Star

Brigadier General Joseph J. McMenamin was a general officer in the United States Marine Corps and was the Assistant Division Commander for the 2nd Marine Division. He had served acting Assistant Secretary of Defense for Special Operations and Low-Intensity Conflict.

== Early years ==
McMenamin is a 1970 graduate of La Salle College High School in Wyndmoor, Pennsylvania. He received a Bachelor of Arts degree in political science from Villanova University in May 1974.

== Marine Corps service ==
McMenamin was commissioned a second lieutenant in the Marine Corps via the Naval Reserve Officer Training Corps program.

Completing The Basic School in December 1974, he was assigned to 2nd Battalion, 9th Marines, 3rd Marine Division, Okinawa, Japan where he served as the 81mm Mortar Platoon Commander and Headquarters & Service Company Executive Officer. Returning from Okinawa in February 1976, he was assigned to Marine Corps Recruit Depot San Diego, where he served as a series officer, battalion adjutant and regimental adjutant.

In October 1979, he transferred to the 1st Marine Division, Camp Pendleton, California where he served as the weapons company commander and the battalion fire support coordinator with the 2nd Battalion, 7th Marines for 3 years. Following this tour, he attended Amphibious Warfare School at Quantico, Virginia.

After completing Amphibious Warfare School, McMenamin reported to The Basic School, where he served as a tactics instructor, tactics section chief, student company commander and assistant tactics group chief. Selected for recruiting duty, he served as the commanding officer of Recruiting Station, Cincinnati, Ohio from June 1986 to June 1989. After recruiting duty, he attended Marine Corps Command and Staff College. Completing school in June 1990, he then served an air-ground exchange tour with the 1st Marine Aircraft Wing in Okinawa, Japan.

Returning to the United States in July 1991, he was initially assigned as the G-3 Training Officer of the 2nd Marine Division, Camp Lejeune, North Carolina. He later assumed command of the 2nd Light Armored Reconnaissance Battalion in July 1992. Completing this assignment in February 1994, he completed his tour with the 2nd Marine Division as the assistant chief of staff, readiness. Following his tour with the 2nd Marine Division, he attended the Naval War College in June 1994. Graduating with a Master of Arts degree in strategic studies and national security affairs in May 1995, he reported for joint duty with the United States Central Command serving as the Strategy Branch Chief and Division Chief, Policy and Strategy Division in the J-5 Plans and Policy Directorate.

In June 1999, he reported for duty as the commanding officer of the Sixth Marine Corps District. Brigadier General McMenamin relinquished command of the Sixth Marine Corps District on June 26, 2001. He served as the commanding general, Marine Corps Recruit Depot Parris Island, South Carolina from June 27, 2001, until May 25, 2004. In June 2004 he was assigned as the director, Iraq Survey Group, Baghdad, Iraq. He assumed duties as the assistant division commander of 2nd Marine Division during December 2004.

== Awards and decorations ==
Brigadier General McMenamin's military decorations include:

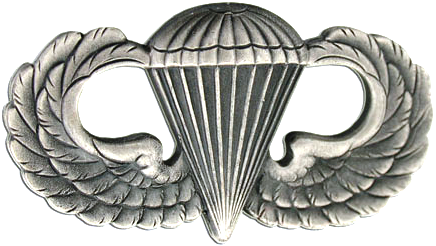

Basic Parachutist Insignia
1st Row		Defense Superior Service Medal		
2nd Row	Legion of Merit	Bronze Star w/ valor device	Meritorious Service Medal	Joint Service Commendation Medal
3rd Row	Joint Service Achievement Medal	Navy and Marine Corps Achievement Medal	Combat Action Ribbon	Joint Meritorious Unit Award w/ 2 oak leaf clusters
4th Row	Navy Unit Commendation w/ 1 service star	Navy Meritorious Unit Commendation w/ 2 service stars	National Defense Service Medal w/ 1 service star	Armed Forces Expeditionary Medal
5th Row	Humanitarian Service Medal w/ 1 service star	Navy Sea Service Deployment Ribbon w/ 2 service stars	Marine Corps Recruiting Ribbon	Marine Corps Drill Instructor Ribbon
