= Derrick Anderson =

American politician, lawyer, and military officer (born 1984)

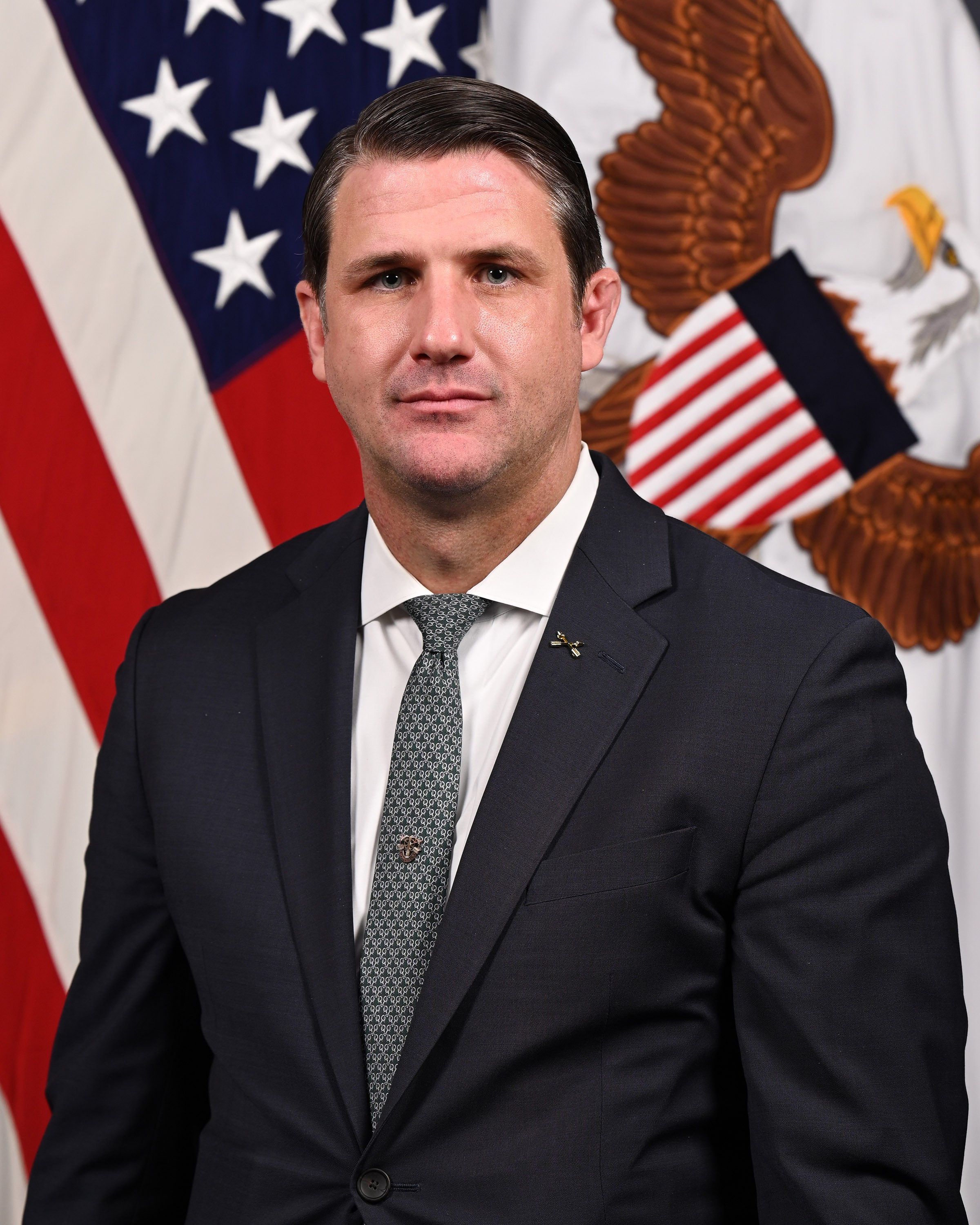
- Official portrait, 2026

Assistant Secretary of Defense for Special Operations and Low-Intensity Conflict
- Incumbent
- Assumed office December 29, 2025
- President: Donald Trump
- Preceded by: Christopher Maier

Assistant Secretary of the Army for Manpower and Reserve Affairs
- Acting
- In office April 9, 2025 – December 29, 2025
- President: Donald Trump
- Preceded by: Julie Banks (acting)
- Succeeded by: Christopher Sims (acting)

Personal details
- Born: August 4, 1984 (age 42) Wheeling, West Virginia, U.S.
- Party: Republican
- Education: Virginia Tech (BA); Georgetown University (JD)

Military service
- Branch/service: United States Army
- Years of service: 2006–present
- Rank: Lieutenant Colonel
- Unit: United States Army Special Forces
- Battles/wars: Iraq War; Operation Iraqi Freedom; War in Afghanistan
- Awards: Bronze Star Medal; Meritorious Service Medal; Afghanistan Campaign Medal; Army Commendation Medal (5); NATO Medal

Derrick M. Anderson (born August 4, 1984) is an American politician, lawyer, and military officer. He serves as Assistant Secretary of Defense for Special Operations and Low-Intensity Conflict since his confirmation on December 18, 2025. He was previously the Republican Party nominee for Virginia's 7th congressional district in 2024 election.

Anderson is a Former Army Green Beret and is currently served as a Lieutenant Colonel in United States Army. He previously served as an Acting Assistant Secretary of the Army (Manpower and Reserve Affairs) from April 9, 2025 to December 18, 2025.

== Early life and education ==
Anderson was born in Wheeling, West Virginia and raised in Spotsylvania County, Virginia. He graduated from Virginia Tech with a BA in political science. He also received a JD from Georgetown University Law Center.

== Military service ==
In 2006, Anderson commissioned as a second lieutenant in United States Army into the infantry. Anderson later graduated from Ranger School. He became a platoon leader in the 3rd Infantry Division in their deployment in Iraq. Anderson was selected to join United States Army Special Forces, completing the Special Forces Qualification Course and subsequently became an A-Team commander. In this capacity, he served in several countries in the Middle East, including a combat tour in Afghanistan. He was also the ground commander when the 2014 Gaza Valley airstrike occurred and five American soldiers were killed in a friendly fire incident.

USAF General Jeffrey L. Harrigian blamed Anderson for the incident, however, Anderson was later cleared and faced no military action related the incident.

== Personal life ==
In 2025, Anderson married fellow Army officer Major Margaret Romanin.
