= Welcome.US =

US refugee support coordination organization

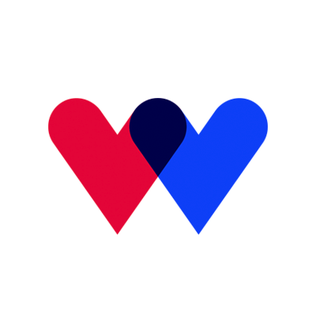
- Formation: September 2021
- Headquarters: US
- CEO: Nazanin Ash
- Co-chairs: John Bridgeland and Cecilia Muñoz
- Website: welcome.us

Welcome.US is a nonprofit organization that coordinates the support of Afghan refugees in the United States.

The organization was formed in 2021 as the U.S. evacuated 100,000 refugees from Afghanistan following the transfer of power to the Taliban.

The organization coordinates government, private sector and non-government organizations providing financial, material and advisory support to Afghan refugees.

The organization is led by Nazanin Ash and supervised by a board of directors that is supported by three former U.S. presidents and three former U.S. first ladies.

== Formation and leadership ==
Welcome.US launched in September 2021, led by CEO Nazanin Ash.

The board of directors is co-chaired by John Bridgeland and Cecilia Muñoz with support from Laura Bush, George W. Bush, Hillary Clinton, Bill Clinton, Michelle Obama, Barack Obama, Khaled Hosseini, and Stanley McCrystal.

== Background ==
By 22 December 2021, over 70,000 of the 100,000 Afghans evacuated by the United States government had arrived in the U.S. and temporarily housed at eight U.S. military bases. As of that same date, just over 40,000 had already left the military bases and moved into housing in various communities.

== Activities ==
Welcome.US coordinates refugee support efforts between all levels of the U.S. government, not for profit organizations, and private sector organizations. The government financial support includes $2,275 per person for rent, food, and clothing, plus a food stipend from the Supplemental Nutrition Assistance Program (SNAP) (formerly known as food stamps) and rent relief. Non-financial support includes help finding housing, learning how to navigate public transit systems, enrolling children in school, completing immigration paperwork, legal support, and access to mental health services.

Government support is supplemented by companies, including Starbucks, CVS Pharmacy, Microsoft, Airbnb and Serta Simmons Bedding, which have donated tea, diapers, and mattresses as well as financial support, temporary housing and job opportunities. Welcome.US uses Needslist software to connect the refugees to these services through resettlement agencies, support groups and corporations.

Welcome.US also provides emergency funding to nonprofit organizations and runs media campaigns to encourage American citizens to support refugees.

In October 2021, Welcome.US collaborated with Miles4Migrants to fund 40,000 flights for Afghan refugees. As of October 2021, 3,200 of the flights have been used so far.

== See also ==
- War in Afghanistan (2001–2021)
- 2021 Kabul airlift
- Convention Relating to the Status of Refugees
