= No One Left Behind =

Charity and veteran service organization

- Abbreviation: NOLB
- Formation: 2013
- Type: 501(c)(3) Corporation
- Purpose: To ensure the United States keeps its moral obligation to our Afghan and Iraqi interpreters
- Headquarters: Merrifield, Virginia, U.S.
- Volunteers: 7 SIV Ambassadors
- Website: www.nooneleft.org

No One Left Behind (NOLB) is a veteran-adjacent nonprofit focused on ensuring America keeps its promise to its SIV (Special Immigrant Visa) allies. The nonprofit evacuates Afghan and Iraqi SIV applicants to safety, supports their resettlement in the United States as new Americans, and advocates on their behalf before Congress and the White House.

Currently, NOLB:

1. Collaborates with the Department of State to evacuate Afghan SIV applicants—11,000 since August 2021.

2. Provides emergency financial and material assistance, mentoring, facilitates employment connections and opportunities, and provides 0% interest loans for vehicles, education, and certifications.

3. Advocates for law and policy to establish permanent mechanisms for the safe resettlement of those who risked their lives for Americans in past and future conflicts, including Syrian and Yemeni combat interpreters who are currently excluded from the SIV programs.

Right now, at least 80,000 SIV applicants wait in limbo for the United States to review their applications following their work for the US government over the course of the War on Terror after the attacks on September 11, 2001.

No One Left Behind operates as a 501(c)(3) nonprofit organization. Out of over 45,000 veterans’ nonprofits operating in the United States. as of 2024, NOLB is the only national organization solely dedicated to assisting SIV allies through the whole process, from evacuation to resettlement.

As of March 2021, NOLB has provided direct aid in over 90 cities. The organization has partnered with State Department-funded Volunteer Agencies and the International Refugee Assistance Project (IRAP) to provide support to the SIV community. According to Charity Navigator, NOLB allocates 76 percent of its revenue to program expenses and 25 percent to fundraising and administrative expenses. The Better Business Bureau Wise Giving Alliance accredited NOLB for meeting all 20 of its standards in 2021.

== Overview ==
No One Left Behind advocates for the Special Immigrant Visa. It conducts three major programs in support of Afghan and Iraqi interpreters for the U.S. government, Special Immigrant Visa recipients and their families. First, No One Left Behind conducts advocacy work in support of the SIV program, to include both annual authorizations for new SIVs and efforts to ensure existing visa processing is fair and consistent with Congress' intent. No One Left Behind is nonpartisan and works with administrations and members of Congress of both parties. It also advises federal agencies on how to execute and improve the SIV program.

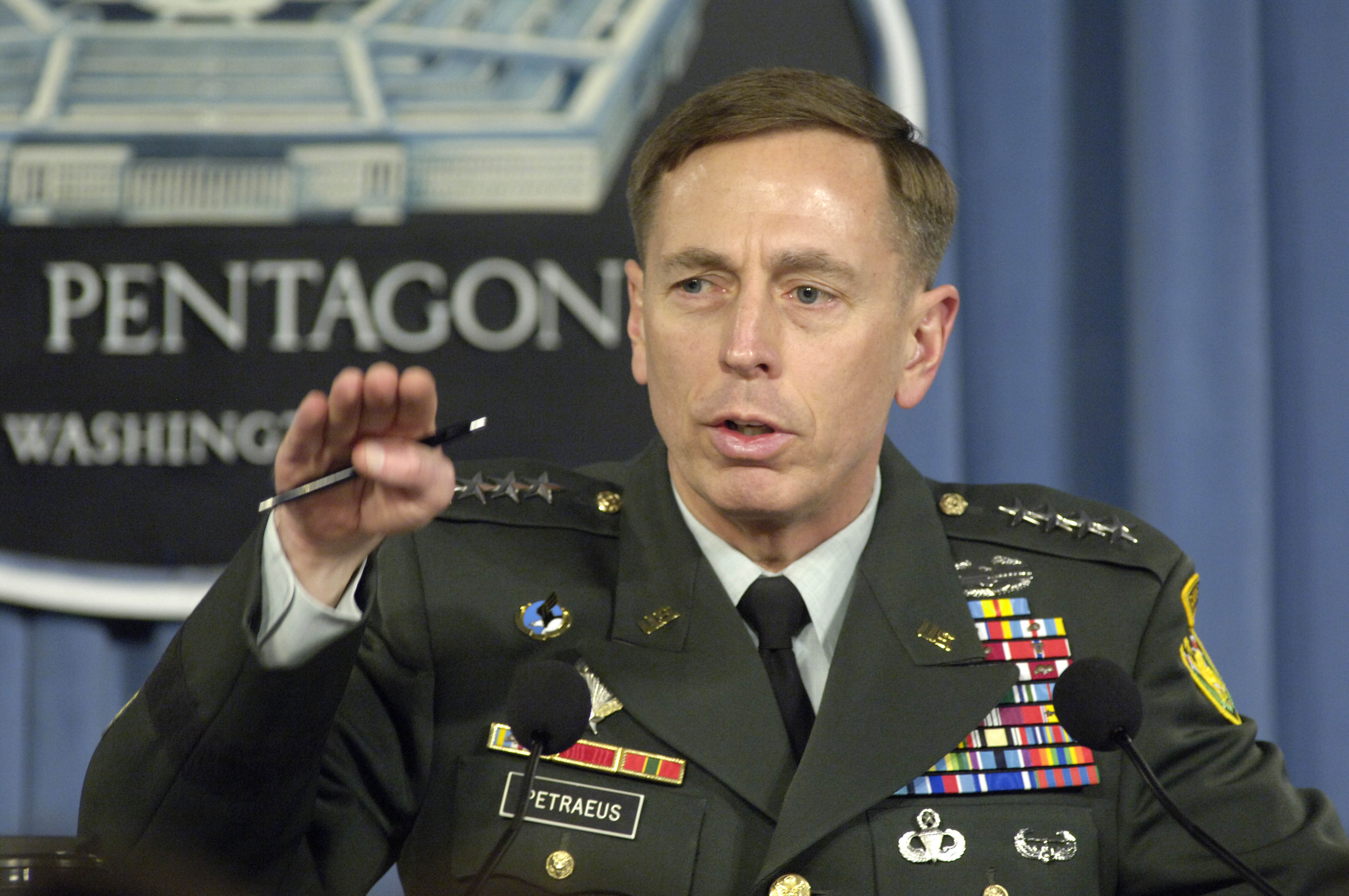
Advisory Board member and retired general David Petraeus has advocated for the SIV program as a "moral obligation."

Second, No One Left Behind provides direct aid to Special Immigrant Visa recipients and their families to fund basic needs like rent, groceries, furniture, and automobiles. Through a partnership with The Change Reaction, it also provides no interest loans. Since 2014, No One Left Behind has provided assistance to over 10,000 Special Immigrant Visa recipients and their family members.

Third, through its network of SIV Ambassadors and staff social workers, No One Left Behind provides community assistance to SIV families when they encounter unique challenges, family emergencies, or have special needs. No One Left Behind also leads efforts to connect, organize and build SIV communities within local areas.

Former Governor Thomas H. Kean and former Representative Lee H. Hamilton served as chairman and vice chairman, respectively, of the 9/11 Commission. They now serve as the chairs of the congressionally mandated Task Force on Extremism in Fragile States, hosted by the United States Institute of Peace. Former Vice President Mike Pence said the following when he was a Congressman in 2007: "Protecting and assisting those who have helped the United States and coalition forces is a moral obligation of the American people... I think there is nothing more important than the United States of America saying to people in Iraq, or anywhere in the world, ‘If you stand by us, we will stand by you." The Department of State has audited the SIV Program twice over the last 12 years. No One Left Behind worked with State Department Office of Inspector General on their last congressionally mandated report.

The Veterans of Foreign Wars and the American Legion have joined other veteran service organizations in calling on Congress to recognize the contributions of Afghan and Iraqi translators.

The Section 1212 of the FY21 National Defense Authorization Act increased the number of appropriated visas for the Afghan SIV program to 22,620.

As of January 2021, the U.S. Embassy in Kabul resumed processing visas. On February 8, 2021, President Biden signed Executive Order 14013. Section 3 of the E.O. specifically addressed major issues with the SIV Program.

== Comparisons to Vietnam ==
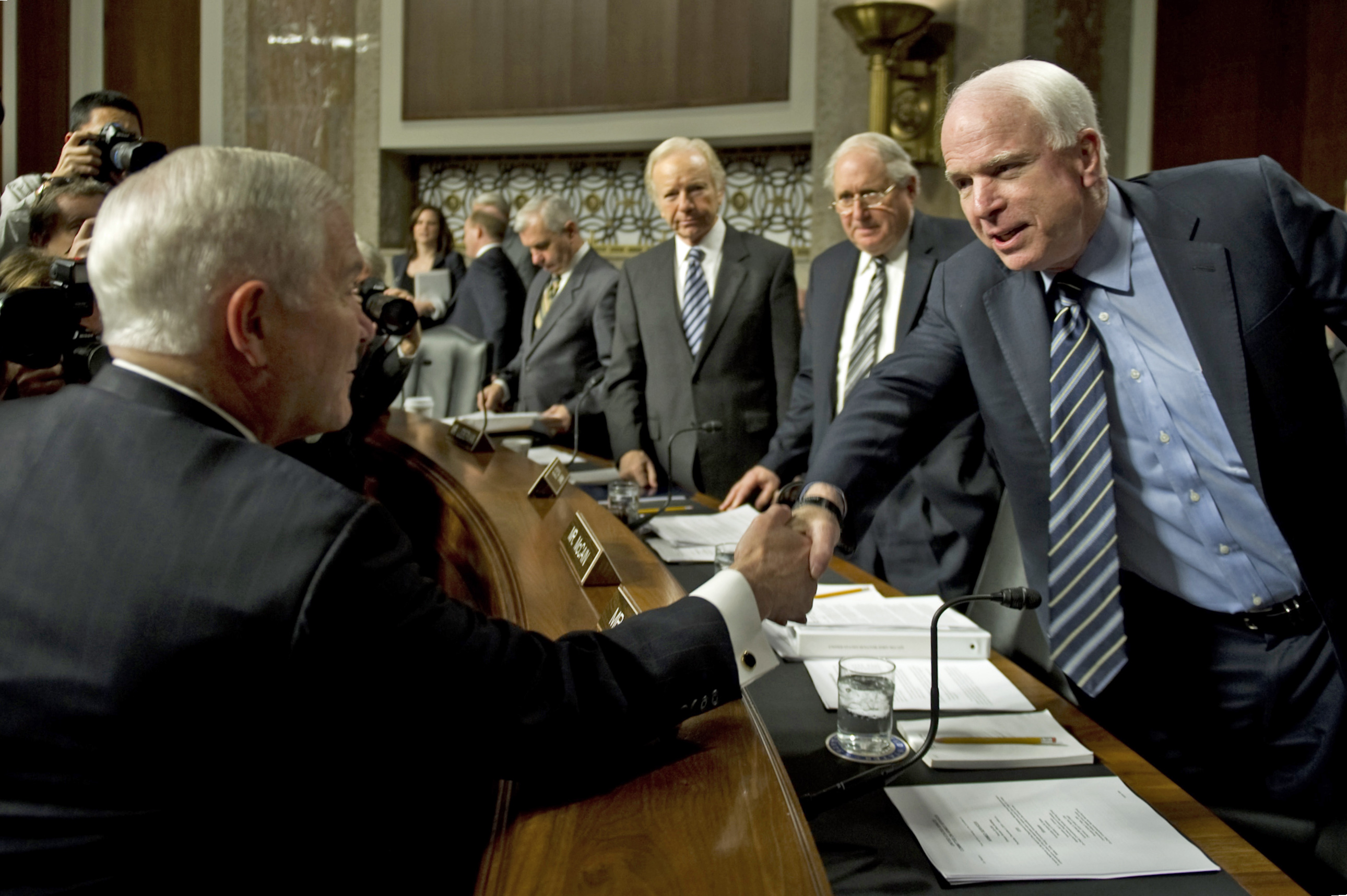
U.S. Senate Committee on Armed Services has inquired on U.S.'s commitment to wartime allies.

On February 11, 2020, Dr. Colin Jackson provided the following testimony to the Senate Armed Services Committee:

I think if we look to past involvements, one of the greatest stains on American honor at the end of the Vietnam War was our inability or unwillingness to take care of the people who had worked for us... I think we can take care of people who have exposed themselves to enormous personal and familial risk... There are so many of these Afghans who have been stalwart allies. They deserve everything we can do to take care and protect them.

Episode 10 of Ken's Burns "The Vietnam War" "The Weight of Memory" discussed the regret U.S. veterans still have for leaving their allies behind.

== NOLB in the media ==
John Oliver covered the SIV program in a 2014 opening monologue in which he concluded that it was “easier to get off heroin (10 steps) than to get a Special Immigrant Visa (14 steps).”

ESPN SC Featured an NFL player and the bond he formed on the battlefield Before he became a Pittsburgh Steeler, Alejandro Villanueva was an Army Ranger who served three tours of duty in Afghanistan and forged a lasting friendship with his Afghan interpreter.

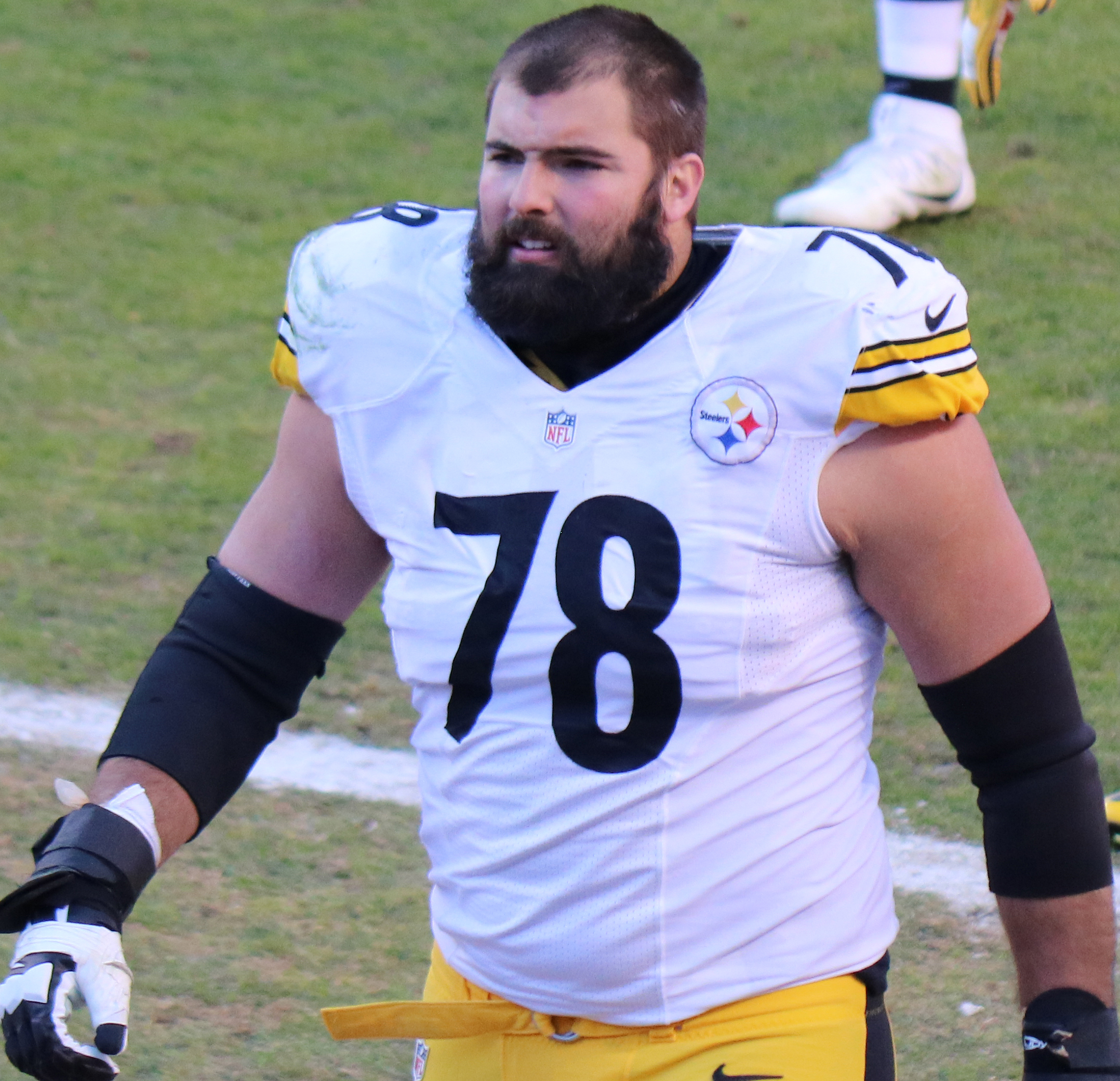
After serving as an Army Ranger in Afghanistan, Alejandro Villanueva formed a lasting friendship with his Afghan translator.

In 2019 PBS aired the miniseries “The Interpreters” to highlight the plight of U.S. allies.

In 2021 CBS will air the sitcom The United States of Al starting on April 1. It tells the story of a Marine resettling his Afghan translator in Ohio.

No One Left Behind was one of many contributing organizations to the success of the 2023 film The Covenant by Guy Ritchie starring Jake Gyllenhal and Dar Salim. The film depicts the struggles of a US Army soldier, who, after being rescued by an Afghan interpreter during an ambush, races against Taliban retaliation to evacuate the interpreter and his family. Multiple SIV ambassadors associated with NOLB attended the premiere of the film held at the DGA Theater, and members of the Board of Directors attended the Washington DC screening of the film, utilizing the film's release as a way to inform audiences about the ongoing struggle of Afghan allies and interpreters still in danger after the US withdrawal. The partnership included a public service announcement crafted by the crew and talent of the film in collaboration with No One Left Behind and other advocacy organizations.

== History ==
During an ambush in 2008, Janis Shinwari, an Afghan interpreter for US forces in Afghanistan, saved the life of US Army 1LT Matt Zeller. After receiving death threats and being targeted by the Taliban for his actions, Shinwari asked Zeller to help him emigrate to the United States through the Special Immigrant Visa program offered by the US State Department. After a lengthy and dangerous approval process, exposing Shinwari to Taliban retribution, he was resettled in the United States. Zeller helped to raise over $35,000 for Shinwari through a GoFundMe campaign, but Shinwari, wanting to pay it forward, requested that the funds be put forward to found No One Left Behind in order to rescue other Afghans in a similar position.

The organization was founded in 2013, with its offices in Arlington, Virginia, and other co-founders including U.S. Army Captain Jason S. Gorey and Brian Steblay. In 2020, NOLB attracted the most bipartisan support for the Afghan SIV program in the House of Representatives since No One Left Behind's founding. After failing to reauthorize the SIV program in fiscal year 2019, Congress authorized 4,000 visas in the fiscal year 2020 National Defense Authorization Act (NDAA). In 2023, No One Left Behind successfully fulfilled Operation Save 1,000, then fulfilled a subsequent Operation Save 2,000 campaign, eventually rescuing over 2,400 Afghan allies and their families over the course of 2023. On January 1, 2024, No One Left Behind merged with Allied Airlift 21, a similar nonprofit composed of veterans dedicated to supporting and urging the US government in its efforts to evacuate US allies in Afghanistan.

== Board of directors ==
As of October 2024, No One Left Behind is led by its Board of Directors, including Chairman Philip Caruso, Vice Chairman Mariah Smith, Treasurer Blake Lindgren, Annie Yu Kleiman, Loren Voss, Parker Normann, Doug Livermore, Greg Fairbank, Howard Manuel, JD Dolan, Matt Waters, Hal Thomas, and France Hoang.
