= Special Immigrant Visa =

Programs for receiving visas to the United States

The Special Immigrant Visa (SIV) programs are programs for receiving a United States visa. The program is administered under the Defense Authorization Act for Fiscal Year 2008, Public Law 110-181, which was signed into law on January 28, 2008.

== SIV programs ==
=== For Afghan nationals who worked for or on behalf of the U.S. government ===
The Department of State has authority to issue SIVs to Afghan nationals under section 602(b) of the Afghan Allies Protection Act of 2009. A total of 34,500 visas have been allocated since December 19, 2014.

==== Eligibility ====
Requirements are:

- Being a national of Afghanistan
- Employed for at least one year between October 7, 2001, and December 31, 2023
  - By, or on behalf of, the U.S. government. State Dept has included those directly hired by the U.S. government, contractors, and subcontractors. It has previously not included those who worked under grants and cooperative agreements. The Averting Loss of Life and Injury by Expediting SIVs Act of 2021 amended this to allow inclusion of grants and cooperative "if the Secretary of State determines, based on a recommendation from the Federal agency or organization authorizing such funding, that such alien contributed to the United States mission in Afghanistan"
  - By ISAF or a successor mission in a capacity that required serving with US military personnel stationed at ISAF (or a successor mission)
- Provided faithful and valuable service to the US government as documented by a recommendation letter
- Must be experiencing a serious and ongoing threat as a consequence of such employment.

==== Application process ====
Applicants must email AfghanSIVApplication@state.gov, put their name and date of birth in the subject line, and attach:

- A recommendation letter from an American citizen who supervised the applicant directly, or if that person cannot be found, a recommendation letter from a non-US citizen counter signed by a US citizen who was overseeing the contract. There is no official template, but applicants may use an unofficial template that meets the requirements.
- A HR letter confirming that the employment of applicant for or on behalf of the US Government. There is no official template, but applicants may use an unofficial template that meets the requirements.
- The applicant's national ID (Tazkera) copy (electronic version, or paper version with an English translation).
- If available, the applicant's Afghan passport copy.
- A signed threat statement (in English) that explains the threats that the applicant has faced as a result of qualifying employment. There is no official template, but applicants may use an unofficial template that meets the requirements.
- If available, copies of the contract between the applicant's employer and the US Government.
- If available, copies of any badges that were issued to the applicant.
- The completed and signed DS-157 form.
- A biodata sheet containing their name, gender, marital status, etc. There is no official template, but applicants may use an unofficial template.

=== For Iraqi Nationals Who Worked for or On Behalf of the U.S. Government ===
Section 1244 of this legislation, entitled "Special Immigrant Status for Certain Iraqis", as amended by section 1 of Public Law 110-244, enacted on January 3, 2008, authorizes 5,000 Special Immigrant Visas (The Kennedy SIV Program for Iraqi Nationals Who Worked for or on Behalf of the U.S. Government) per annum for Iraqi employees and/or contractors for fiscal years 2008 through 2012. This provision creates a new category of Special Immigrant Visa (SIV) for Iraqi nationals who have provided faithful and valuable service to the U.S. government, while employed by or on behalf of the U.S. government in Iraq, for not less than one year after March 20, 2003, and who have experienced or are experiencing an ongoing serious threat as a consequence of that employment.

==== Eligibility ====
Foreign nationals must self-petition for this special immigrant visa classification only if they can establish that they meet the following requirements:

- must be a national of Iraq;
- must have been employed by, or on behalf of the United States Government in Iraq, on or after March 20, 2003, for a period of not less than one year;
- must have provided faithful and valuable service to the United States Government, which is documented in a letter of recommendation from the employee’s supervisor that is approved by the Chief of Mission (COM);
- must have experienced or be experiencing an ongoing serious threat as a consequence of the employment by the United States Government, as determined through a risk assessment conducted by the Chief of Mission (COM) or the designee of the COM;
- must be able to clear a background check and appropriate screening as determined by the Secretary of Homeland Security (DHS); and,
- must be otherwise eligible to receive an immigrant visa and otherwise admissible to the United States for permanent residence, except in determining such admissibility, the grounds for inadmissibility specified in section 212(a)(4) of the Immigration and Nationality Act (8 U.S.C. 1182 (a)(4)), relating to "public charge" shall not apply.

==== Relevant Laws ====
In addition to the program's enacting Defense Authorization Act for Fiscal Year 2008 legislation, the United States Congress has enacted various other statutes and amendments into public law with relevance to the S.I.V. program.

Law	Date	Summary
Emergency Afghan Allies Extension Act of 2014 H.R. 5195 (Section 1 of Public Law 113-160)	August 8, 2014	This law, signed on August 8, 2014, extended the Afghan SIV Program. It authorizes the issuance of 1,000 visas to principal applicants by December 31, 2014. It also extended the date by which applicants must apply for Chief of Mission approval from September 30, 2014 to December 31, 2014.
The Consolidated Appropriations Act for 2014 H.R. 3547 Section 7034(o) of Division K, Title VII of Public Law 113-76	January 17, 2014	This law, signed on January 17, 2014, extended the Afghan SIV Program. It authorizes the issuance of 3,000 visas to principal applicants in fiscal year (FY) 2014 and allows that any unissued visas from FY 2014 be allocated to FY 2015. It also establishes that the one-year employment period must have commenced on or after October 7, 2001 and been completed on or before December 31, 2014 and that applicants must apply for Chief of Mission approval no later than September 30, 2014.
The National Defense Authorization Act for Fiscal Year 2014 H.R. 3304 Section 1219 of Division A, Title XII, Subtitle B of Public Law 113-66	December 26, 2013	This law included provisions for: consideration of a credible sworn statement depicting dangerous country conditions, together with official evidence of such country conditions from the U.S government, as a factor in a determination of whether an applicant has experienced or is experiencing an ongoing serious threat as a consequence of employment by the U.S. government; not more than one written appeal of a COM denial, within 120 days of receiving the denial letter; and representation during the application process, including at relevant interviews and examinations, by an attorney or other accredited representative.
The Afghan Allies Protection Act of 2009 H.R. 4594 Section 602(b) of Division F, Title IV, of the Omnibus Appropriations Act, 2009, Public Law 111-8	March 11, 2009	This law allowed up to 1,500 Afghan nationals who provided faithful and valuable service to the U.S. government, while employed by or on behalf of the U.S. government in Afghanistan after October 7, 2001, for not less than one year, and who have experienced or are experiencing an ongoing serious threat as a consequence of that employment, to receive special immigrant visas (SIVs) annually through FY 2013, with the allocation of any unused visas from FY 2013 to FY 2014.
The Omnibus Appropriations Act for 2009 H.R. 1105 Public Law 111-8	March 11, 2009	This law initially made Afghan and Iraqi SIV holders eligible for the same resettlement assistance, entitlement programs, and other benefits as refugees admitted under the U.S. Refugee Admissions Program for up to six (6) months from their date of admission or date of adjustment if applying domestically. The period of eligibility was later extended under subsequent legislation.
The Consolidated Appropriations Act for 2008 H.R. 2764 Public Law 110-161	December 26, 2007	This law extended the period of eligibility of Afghan SIV holders for resettlement assistance, entitlement programs, and other benefits to up to eight (8) months from their date of admission or date of adjustment if applying domestically. For Afghan SIV holders already in the U.S. to be eligible for uninterrupted benefits for an additional two months beyond the original six months (6) allowed under previous law, you must have been admitted to the U.S. on or after September 10, 2008, or if applying domestically, have a date of adjustment of September 10, 2008 or later.

=== For Iraqi National Translators/Interpreters ===
Under section 1059 of the National Defense Authorization Act for Fiscal Year 2006, Public Law 109-163, up to 50 Iraqi and Afghan translators working for the U.S. military have been eligible for SIVs each fiscal year (FY). Public Law 110-36, which President Bush, Jr., signed into law on June 15, 2007, amended section 1059 by expanding the total number of beneficiaries to 500 a year for FY 2007 and FY 2008 only. In FY 2009, the number of visas available for this category reverted to 50 annually. In addition to these Frequently Asked Questions for Applicants, also see the USCIS Fact Sheet on Afghan and Iraqi Translators.

As amended, section 1059 provides for SIV status for eligible Iraqi and Afghan translators and interpreters who have worked directly with United States Armed Forces or under Chief of Mission (COM) authority.
