= Optica =

Optica may refer to:

- Optica (Africa), an optical and optometry retail chain based in Kenya
- Optica (journal), a scientific journal on optics
- Optica (society), a scientific organisation supporting optics research and education
- Edgley Optica, an aircraft
- Lithops optica, a plant
- Optica Optics Software, software for optical ray-tracing and engineering design
- Optica, a 2013 album by Shout Out Louds
