= Father Schools in Senegal =

Father Schools refers to a recent but growing resistance and educational movement in Senegal advocating for an end to Female Genital Mutilation (FGM, also known as FGC — female genital cutting) and child marriage. Through the establishment of community Father Schools, which aim to educate and spread awareness among fathers about the harms of FGM, the movement emphasizes the importance of the male role in pushing back against these traditional practices. While FGM remains pervasive throughout rural southeast Senegal, the practice has been reported to have declined in villages that implemented Father Schools programming.

== History of Senegal's efforts to end FGM ==
The first and primary movement to mobilize and gain traction protesting FGM in Senegal was founded by Tostan, an NGO dedicated to non formal education in local languages and community-led development. In 1996, human rights and women's health was added to the Tostan curriculum following a landmark study of 10,000 women, an addition that ultimately led to a group of women in the village of Malicounda Bambara becoming the first in Senegal to publicly declare their commitment to ending practices such as FGM and child/forced marriage in 1997. Tostan's Community Engagement Program (CEP) places particular emphasis on an "organized diffusion" strategy: rallying the entire village around education on women's health and human rights through open dialogue with relatives and neighboring villages, ultimately aiming for a public declaration where villages and kin networks pledge their commitment to uphold human rights, particularly through abandoning practices such as FGM.

These community-led transformation efforts sparked further movements across Senegal to end FGM. In 1997 and 1998, Senegalese village chief and imam Demba Diawara launched a comprehensive and culturally congruent strategy to end FGM, placing family, social, and religious networks at the core of his advocacy work: "A person's family is not [only] their village. The family includes one's entire social network: their relatives in many surrounding villages, in all of the places they marry, even in far off countries like France and the United States ... If you truly want to bring about widespread change ... they must all be involved." Accordingly, Diawara's advocacy consistently emphasized entire networks of marriage-affiliated villages because, in his view, a particular group abandoning FGM will inspire the groups with whom they intermarry to do the same. Indeed, in 1998, as a result of Diawara's influence, the first inter-village declaration of FGM/C's abandonment came about as a collective decision among 13 intermarrying villages.

Both legislative and international efforts have been implemented to combat FGM in Senegal. The Senegalese Parliament banned FGM in 1999 and, in partnership with UNFPA and UNICEF, launched a National Action Plan to combat FGM by embedding Tostan's human rights model within official government policy. In 2019, the first African summit on FGM and child marriage abandonment took place in Dakar.

== Cultural context of Father Schools ==
In South Senegal in particular, FGM is often upheld by men, as well as older women, through a series of norms that define FGM as a prerequisite to marriage and social inclusion. In addition, men’s overrepresentation in making decisions for their female counterparts, both wives and daughters, further perpetrates FGM in the region. In sub-Saharan Africa, Senegal is among the top ten countries with the highest increase in the prevalence of husbands’ decision making dominance between 2005 and 2012. Only 6.6% of women in Senegal indicate that they make the decisions about their own health care, and more than 81% of women say that it is mainly their husband or someone else that make decisions regarding major household purchases.

Accordingly, Father Schools emerged as an extension of prior efforts to combat FGM and promote gender equality, but with a particular emphasis on men in order to leverage Senegalese men's uniquely high levels of decision-making influence and bargaining power. To that end, Father Schools use an awareness raising campaign both to encourage fathers’ advocacy for their daughters, and husbands' for their wives.

The FGM/C Research Initiative found religion effects FGM prevalence rates in Senegal: 24.1% among Muslims and 4.6% among Christians. Furthermore, in a UNICEF study on Female Genital Mutilation in Senegal, several participants stated their belief that excision was in accordance with a recommendation of the Muslim faith. Accordingly, Father Schools and similar advocacy programs have incorporated imams and other cultural leaders as a vehicle for encouraging men to consider abandoning FGM and other rigid gender norms. For example, Imam Ibrahima Diane leads classes for 'Schools for Husbands,' a program that address gender inequality within households by encouraging husbands to challenge traditional gender norms and promote maternal health, dual household labor, and spousal support. Both programs aim to transform norms that once perpetrated harmful practices and gendered divisions of labor into norms that dismantle it. For example, Imam Ibrahima Diane often evokes aspects of Islam to advocate for better treatment of women: “The Prophet himself says a man who does not help support his wife and children is not a good Muslim.”

In Senegal, strict norms surrounding parenthood and gendered divisions of labor dictate that raising children is exclusively seen as "women's work." 87% of all household production in Senegal is performed by women and girls. However, early involvement of men in childhood has a statistically positive influence in young children, with fathers' positive engagement linked to better cognitive and social–emotional skills. To that end, Schools for Husbands promote gender equality by engaging men to challenge norms and raise awareness about positive correlations between male involvement and child development outcomes. Classes oriented towards husbands emphasize discussions around gender-based violence, the importance of hospital births over home births fighting stigma around HIV, and encouraging men to be more involved in household chores.

Lastly, Schools for Husbands leaders adopt a culturally congruent approach by focusing discussions on gender equality while avoiding LGBTQ+ issues, which in Senegal remains a highly stigmatized subject.

== Father Schools Framework ==
Founded by Plan International, Father Schools in Senegal follow a framework based on the Strengthening Health Outcomes for Women and Children (SHOW) Program by Promundo. SHOW considers engaging men to be one of the core gender-transformative strategies to positively impact outcomes in Maternal, Newborn, and Child health and Sexual and Reproductive Health (MNCH/SRH). Accordingly, Father Schools follow a peer-to-peer model to train fathers and religious leaders as community role models "in promoting MNCH, preventing gender-based violence (GBV), and challenging harmful practices." Their engagement is broken into two components: one geared towards fathers and ending FGM, and one geared towards husbands and improving gender equality and maternal health.

The Father Schools program launched in Senegal in 2011 with the goal of not only combatting FGM and child marriage, but also changing men’s attitudes around maternal health. These issues are interconnected, as FGM often leads to childbirth complications later in life. According to the World Health Organization, FGM survivors are 2.6 times more likely to experience prolonged or obstructed labor and the risk of stillbirth or neonatal death is 1.6 times higher. To that end, raising awareness about maternal health has remained a key strategy for Father Schools to encourage FGM abandonment. One longstanding member of the Father School, Bamba, a farmer, griot, radio presenter, and father explained his approach: “...I returned to raise awareness... I used opportunities, like when a woman had childbirth complications, to highlight the consequences of FGM – blood loss and other issues – and explained it was due to FGM.” Raising awareness is a crucial strategy, particularly because, in Senegal, girls are increasingly undergoing FGM at younger and younger ages without any ceremony, meaning that it has become such a "behind-closed-doors" tradition that, according to UNICEF, "many men know absolutely nothing about it. It is exclusively a women's affair!" and some have never even heard of the practice despite it being so widely practiced.

The Father Schools approach is in line with Social Convention Theory, which maintains that practices such as FGM arise as a self-fulfilling convention in contexts of extreme resource inequality as a strategy to secure a better marriage by signaling fidelity, and as a means of enforcing the imperial male's exclusive sexual access to his female. When FGM emerges as a status symbol among elite men who can then boast exclusive access to their female consort, these marriage practices often trickle down to the rest of society and thus become a key tool of upward socioeconomic mobility. Therefore, according to Mackie, demographics of FGM prevalence in Senegal are consistent with this pattern: rates of FGM are higher in resource-poor, rural areas (34%) than in urban areas (22%). Furthermore, regions of high ethnic homogeneity also have extremely high levels of FGM prevalence, with the Kolda and Matam regions experiencing 94% and 93% respectively, highlighting FGM as a deeply engrained social convention among members of the same ethnic group who maintain the practice for generations. In contrast, Dakar, a region with high immigration, experiences low FGM prevalence. Therefore, according to proponents of Social Convention Theory, combatting FGM requires getting to the root of its origins — social conventions established by elite behavior and resource inequality.

Accordingly, the Father Schools' curriculum places particular emphasis on community leaders such as griots, imams, village chiefs, and marabouts. Overall, in Senegal, 80.6% of women and 77.8% of men aged 15–49 believe FGM/C should not continue, yet the practice continues to persist, which is why the Father Schools focuses so adamantly on open dialogue and a peer to peer model to challenge norms. However, one drawback of the Father Schools program is the difficulty of directly measuring the efficacy of its framework due to the relative recency of its inception (since 2011) and due to the nature of its rural, locally run, dialogue driven, and often informal approach. Therefore, a noted absence of concrete statistics.

== Impact of Father Schools ==
Currently, Plan International has reported that by 2016, 311 members of the Fathers’ School had reached more than 27,278 people in the Kédougou region of Senegal. In at least three small villages in southeastern Senegal where Father Schools programming was implemented, the once-universal practice of FGM has largely disappeared. Accordingly, due to changing norms in these villages, fathers that once enforced FGM shifted to actively prevent it by reporting any cases of FGM to local authorities (gendarmerie) and promoting girl's education and health. By increasing male involvement in promoting gender equality and FGM abandonment, Plan International and participant testimonies further report increased women’s access to reproductive health services and shifted attitudes around the matter in areas that have implemented the Father Schools program. However, the absence of concrete, updated statistics make direct assessments of impact difficult. Lastly, Plan International further reports that hundreds of men have been trained in over 20 schools throughout Senegal, and locals report that elder men who once reinforced and perpetuated traditional practices now advocate for gender equality.

Research by BMC Pregnancy and Childbirth highlights the particularly crucial role of the entourage in Senegal, a kin-based network of care providers who all aim to support the mother through childbirth. As a member of the entourage, therefore, husbands play a crucial role in these processes. To that end, the Father Schools have not only provided education in combatting FGM and promoting gender equality, but also led to increases in male domestic support, particularly supporting their wives during pregnancy, taking them to the hospital, and helping with domestic work at home. According to the Ministry of Women, Family, Gender and Child Protection, changing men’s attitudes remains a crucial step in reducing rates of infant and maternal mortality.

Senegal has also achieved significant improvements in maternal and newborn health in recent decades. According to the World Bank and Healthy Newborn Network, maternal and infant deaths remain high yet are declining in Senegal, with 237 maternal deaths recorded for every 100,000 live births in 2023 (down from 540 in 1990) and an infant mortality of 21 newborns out of every 1,000. The World Health Organization attributes Senegal's recent progress in maternal health to community based approaches, particularly programs which build upon traditional practices such as the "Badiénou Gox" program which draws on the traditional leadership role of the role of badiène –the sister of the head of the family – to train respected community women as health educators to promote antenatal care and facility delivery. Similarly, Senegal's "health hut" system distributes basic maternal services to remote villages. However, due to the presence of multiple community based programs advocating FGM abandonment and maternal health across the country, measuring the specific impact of any particular initiative is difficult. Instead, progress in maternal health in Senegal has been attributed to be the result of sustained national commitment and a wide range of community-based movements and organizations.
