= Nguerigne Bambara =

N'Guerigne Bambara
- Village
- Location in Senegal
- Coordinates: 14°28′37″N 17°2′8″W
- Country: Senegal
- Region: Thiès Region

N'Guerigne Bambara or Nguerigne Bambara or Nguering is a small village in the Thiès Region in Senegal. The village is known internationally because of its early decision to renounce Female Genital Cutting.

== Description ==
Nguerigne Bambara is small settlement with a Grand Mosque near the coastal town of Ngaparou. There is a hotel.

In 1997 the village of Malicounda Bambara was the first to unilaterally decide to stop female genital cutting. The decision had arisen spontaneously following a development course by the charity Tostan. People from N'Guerigne Bambara had been on the same course and they decided to follow the other villages example on 6 November 1997. Later that month the President of Senegal spoke in support of Malicounda's initiative. The third village might have been Keur Simbara, but Demba Diawara who was an imam there decided that he would persuade other villages in the social group to make the change too. He spent months persuading other villages to join Malicounda Bambara, N'Guerigne Bambara and Keur Simbara and this led to a combined announcement at Diabougou. Keur Simbara has received Ministers from other countries and its representatives were praised by their own President and Hillary Clinton.
