= Jessica Posner =

Social entrepreneur

Jessica Posner is a social entrepreneur and activist. She is the co-founder of the non-profit organization Shining Hope for Communities (SHOFCO) and CEO of Girl Effect.

== Life and education ==
Posner was born in Denver, Colorado and raised in a Jewish family. She studied political theater work abroad at Wesleyan University in Middletown, Connecticut. In 2007, she met Kenny Odede and they worked together on Shining Hope for Communities, an organization that aims to improve gender equality and reduce poverty by providing education programs, community forums, health clinics, working toilets, and sources of clean water.

She returned to Denver at the end of the school semester in 2007 and helped Kenny escape the political violence in Kibera. He attended Wesleyan University on a full scholarship until it was safe for them to return to Kenya.

In 2009, Posner was acting co-founder and CEO of SHOFCO and the Kibera School for Girls was opened.

In 2015, Posner and Odede published the autobiography "Find Me Unafraid" about their life together in the slums. The book was runner up for that Dayton Literary Peace Prize in 2016 for the category nonfiction.

Posner became CEO of Girl Effect in 2019, a non-governmental organization that aims to improve girls' health, education, and livelihoods by connecting them to information and resources across Africa and Asia.

On October 10, 2019, she launched Chhaa Jaa (Go Forth and Shine), a youth program for girls in India, with the goal of empowering young girls through digital media.

== Awards and honors ==
Posner received the "VH1 2010 Do Something Grand Award" for Top world-changer 25 and Under for her work in opening Kibera's first free school for girls.

== Personal life ==
Posner married Kenny Odede in 2012. They have 3 children.

== Publications ==
- Find Me Unafraid: Love, Loss, and Hope in an African Slum.
