= Demba Diawara =

Senegalese imam and village leader

- Born: c.1931
- Education: no formal education
- Known for: leadership of villages to renounce Female Genital Cutting

Demba Diawara (born c. 1931) is an imam and village leader of Keur Simbara in Senegal. He is known for his leadership in encouraging village communities to abandon the tradition of female genital cutting. He knew of the first declarations at the Senegalese village of Malicounda Bambara to abandon FGC in 1997 and he led his village and many more to the first multilateral announcement at Diabougou in 1998.

== Life ==
Diawara was born in about 1931. He is an imam and a chief of the small, but now well known, village of Keur Simbara in western Senegal.

=== Unilateral declaration and problem ===
Diawara had been initially concerned in 1997 when he heard that the nearby village of Malicounda Bambara was declaring that it intended to stop the Bambara tradition of female genital cutting. A second village, Nguerigne Bambara, followed on November 6, 1997. He went to Malicounda Bambara to express his alarm but he was sent away and told to speak first to the women of his own village. Diawara took this advice and he saw the benefits of change. The women told him things that he had never known. He knew that his niece was mentally ill and his sister-in-law was not able to have children, circumstances that he attributed to FGC. He never knew how much it hurt and he had never seen what an uncut woman looked like. Diawara wanted his village to follow their lead but he foresaw two problems. He realised that other villages would still consider his village's girls unclean because they were not cut and these girls may have to remain unmarried. He realised that he needed to look at the whole of the village's extended social network if they were to create permanent change. The second problem was that this subject needed to be raised delicately. Some activists used explicit images and they condemned the traditions and those villagers who had, in good faith, observed them for generations.

=== Multilateral declaration and solution ===
Diawara, his nephew and the woman who did the cutting in his village walked to spread the message. They used Diawara's social network. Diawara visited distant relatives from his paternal line and from his maternal line. He said

"A person's family is not their village. The family includes one's entire social network: their relatives in many surrounding villages, in all of the places they marry ... If you truly want to bring about widespread change ... they must all be involved"

Diawara had to raise a delicate subject and persuade the local social network. He decided to just present the facts and to not suggest a conclusion. He was able to mention that this was a secular and not a religious tradition. Diawara's approach was later used as a model of change-management by the anti-FGC charity Tostan.

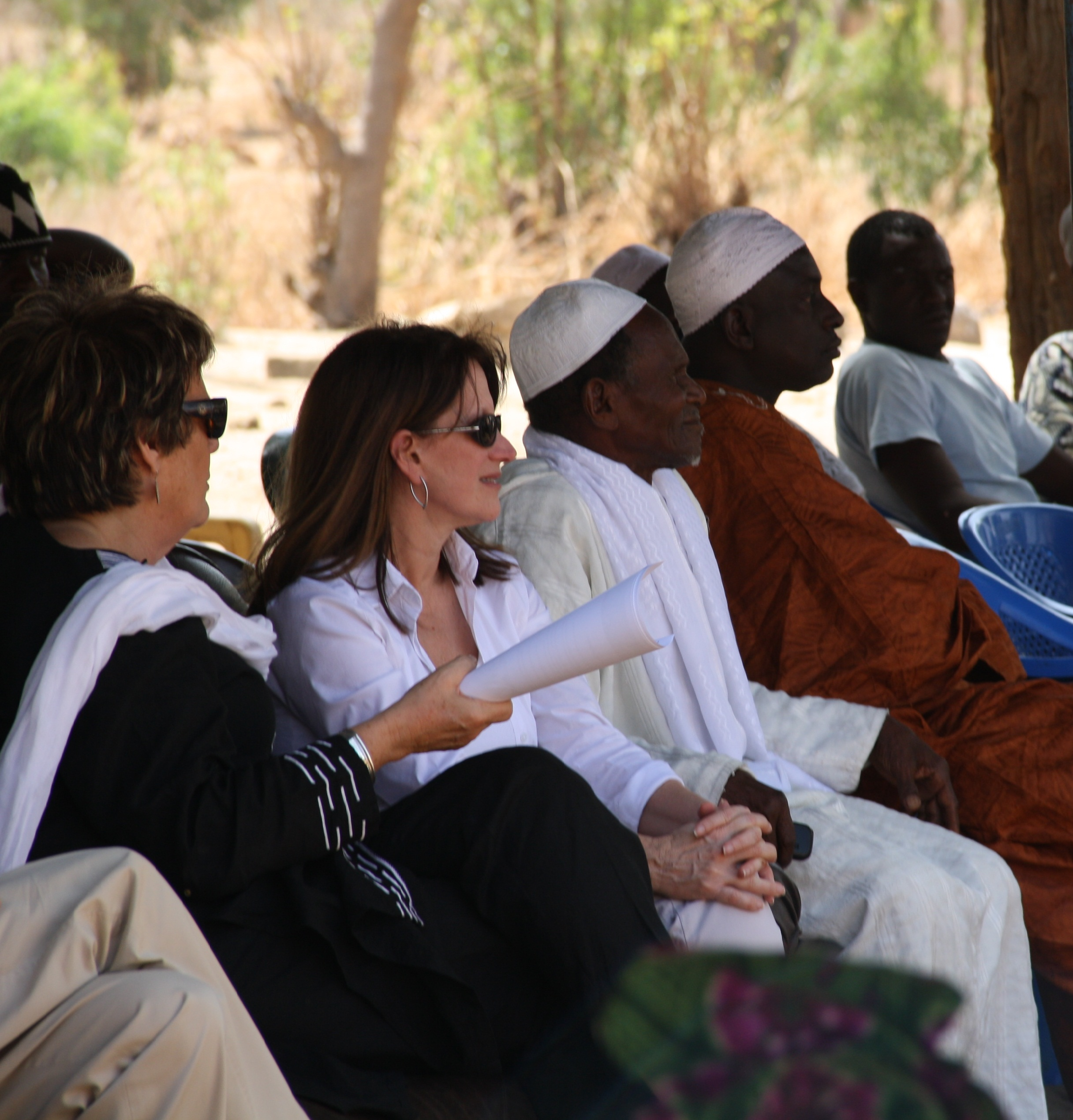
Molly Melching, Lynne Featherstone, Demba Diawara and Khalidou Sy in Keur Simbara in 2013

Diawara's solution achieved international recognition and attention. On 14 February 1998 fifty representatives from thirteen villages met at Diabougou near the border with Mali to end the tradition of Female Genital Cutting (FGC). The villages had an estimated total population of 8,000 people. Diawara had organised the first multi-lateral commitment to end FGC in Senegal. The declaration had been organised by Diawara and the charity Tostan. Diawara chose the village of Diabougou as the site of the ceremony. Previously villages had made this commitment following external support from charities like Tostan but Diawara was able to use his own resources to create this cultural commitment to change.

The agreement was translated into other languages but it was first drafted in the Wolof language. The leaders commitment was witnessed and reported by the media and the activist Molly Melching. This agreement resolved the problem identified by Diawara because it meant that girls and boys could find partners from other villages. Amongst the crowd was the woman who had performed the cutting and despite losing her income she was committed to the change.

=== Legacy ===
Weeks after the Diagoubou declaration Hillary Clinton (and her husband who was then the president) gave a speech against FGC on 2 April in Senegal which attracted international coverage. Diawara's approach to communicating with his social network was later used as a model by the anti-FGC charity Tostan in their training of activists. Diawara's views were not universally welcomed. Some lamented the loss of tradition and saw Hillary Clinton's speech as "white people" telling Africans what to do. Diawara's approach grew and in 1999, another multilateral declaration involved 105 villages with an estimated total population of 80,000 people. The Senegalese government outlawed the practice, but laws may not effect a whole village's traditions in the same way as Diawara's persuasion.
