= Diabougou (Thiès) =

- Village
- Location in Senegal
- Coordinates: 14°10′N 16°46′W
- Country: Senegal
- Region: Thiès Region
- Time zone: UTC + 0

Diabougou is a village in the Thiès Region of western Senegal. The village was the site of the "Diagoubou Declaration". This was the first multilateral announcement to renounce the practice of female genital cutting in Senegal.

== Description ==
=== FGC ===
The village of Diabougou came to international notice in 1998 when it was the site of a public declaration by a group of villages to end the local tradition of what is known as Female Genital Cutting (FGC). The first declaration had been organised by the Senegalese imam Demba Diawara and the American charity worker Molly Melching. Diawara chose Diabougou to make the "Diabougou Declaration". Diawara had invested a lot of his time in persuading other communities. On 14 February 1998 fifty representatives from twelve nearby villages met to commit to this change. The thirteen villages involved contained an estimated 8,000 people and this was the first time a number of villages had made a commitment to end FGC.

Diawara knew that two villages Malicounda Bambara and Nguerigne Bambara had already decided to renounce the practice of FGC but he and his village of Keur Simbara had identified a problem. He realised that girls from a village making a unilateral move to stop FGC would find it impossible to find partners in nearby villages. The multilateral declaration was intended to address the problem identified by Diawara. The declaration by these villages followed a first declaration made by the village of Malicounda Bambara the year before. The agreement was written in the Wolof language.

First Lady Hillary Clinton visited Senegal and in support of the villages who had abandoned FGC publicly. Her speech on 2 April highlighted the "Diabougou Declaration". Local leaders became heroes and Aissa Tou Sarr who had been the woman who carried out the FGC for $8.60 had bravely chosen to end what had been her skill and contribution.
