= Malicounda Bambara =

- village
- Location in Senegal
- Coordinates: 14°28′18.8″N 16°56′47.2″W
- Country: Senegal
- Region: Thiès
- Department: M'bour
- Arrondissement: Sindia
- Settled by the Bambara: 1902
- Arrival of the Fula: 1903

Government
  - Chief: Mamadou Ba

Population
  - Total: 3,323
  - Ethnic groups: Bambara; Soninke; Susu; Wolof

Malicounda Bambara is a village in the rural community of Malicounda within M'bour Department of the Thiès Region in western Senegal, located northeast of Saly on the Petite-Côte and approximately 85 km from the Senegalese capital of Dakar. It is one of three villages all named Malicounda, but with affixes Bambara, Sérère and Wolof, each denoting the prevalent ethnicity. The three are closely connected through relations. Malicounda Bambara is especially notable for being the first village in Senegal to publicly abandon the traditional practice of female genital cutting.

== Etymology ==
The origin of the name Malicounda is subject of dispute. Whilst it is commonly thought to reference the heritage of the immigrants who founded the village, dignitaries of Malicounda Sérère hold that it comes from the Serer words mal meaning 'spontaneous wild herbs' and koundal 'a place that is inhabited by jinns', and due to a transcription error mal became mali and stuck.

== History ==
The area was first settled in 1901 by Samba Ba and Karfa Traoré, two peanut farmers from neighbouring Mali in search of fertile land. The village was then founded in 1902 by Barka Sanokho, leader of a small group of Bambara migrants, also from Mali. Earlier, they had briefly stayed in Saly. The area proved to be fruitful and thus attracted other groups. A year later the Firdous, Fula people from the Kolda region in Casamance, arrived under the leadership of Samba Ba, as did seasonal workers from Burkina Faso and Mali, over the years many of them would decide to stay. A large wave of immigration of Bambaras in search of arable land for peanut cultivation followed as well.

Malicounda Bambara's size increased greatly and was divided into the three districts Barkabougou, Binabougou and Karfabougou, which were initially led by Barka Sanokho, Bounama Diarrisso and Karfa Sidibé respectively. The prior also became the first chief of the village up until his death in 1904. Barkabougou, by far the largest, was further split into the merchant's district known as Dioulacounda, Khaidacounda, which was founded by marabout Fode Bocar Doucouré and Nioroncounda, inhabited by people from Nioro.

=== Chiefs ===
The first chiefs were not elected.

- 1902–1904 Barka Sanokho
- 1904–1905 Samba Diarra

From Samba Diarra's death onwards chiefs were elected:

- 1905–1930 Mamadou Ba
- 1930–1962 Toubey Sow
- 1962–1988 Kao Ba
- 1989–2006 Sheikh Amala Sow
- 2006–2021 Samba Sow
- 2021–present Mamadou Ba

== Population ==
The population of Malicounda Bambara is young and fast-growing. In younger generations there has been a shift away from farming towards paid work in hotels in Saly or Dakar. According to the latest census, the village has a population of 3,323 people, living in 379 households.

The village counts four ethnic groups among its population, namely Bambara, Soninke, Susu and Wolof. The inhabitants are predominantly Sunni Muslims and either followers of Tijānī Sheikh Amala Sow or Qadiri Sheikh Bou Kounta from Ndiassane.

== The Declaration ==
On July 31, 1997, the women of Malicounda Bambara decided to announce their decision to abandon female genital cutting (FGC) to the world. They were joined by 20 Senegalese journalists as well as representatives of the Ministries of Health and Family, Social Action and National Solidarity to witness the first public declaration ending the practice of FGC. This social convention is believed to have originated in Egypt over 2,000 years ago and today is practiced in at least 28 African countries. FGC is a social norm in practicing cultures, and an uncut women coming from a practicing village would be excluded from her social group, family, friends and have difficulty finding a spouse. The actual operation is usually done by a designated woman in the community at the behest of the mother or grandmother of the girl undergoing the procedure.

Halting FGC has been an aim of various local and international NGOs since the 1970s, when the term female genital mutilation was coined in order to establish, according to the WHO, "a clear linguistic distinction from male circumcision, and [to emphasize] the gravity and harm of the act." The term female genital cutting is generally preferred among agencies working to end the practice. FGC is seen as less stigmatizing than FGM, and indeed is the term used at the local level when discussed by practicing groups. NGOs working to end FGM/C in Senegal and elsewhere in Africa generally prefer to use FGC in an effort to communicate respect for traditional culture and avoid demonization of practitioners as well as women who have been subject to the procedure.

The women of Malicounda Bambara came to their decision while taking part in the Community Empowerment Program (CEP) of the international NGO Tostan, based in Dakar. Tostan's holistic program in fact does not take the abandonment of FGC as its overarching goal; the declaration of Malicounda Bambara was made entirely on the volition of the class members – with the support of the wider community – after sessions covering human rights, health and hygiene.

=== Tostan's influence ===
After several courses addressing human rights and women's rights, facilitator Ndéye Maguette Diop began Session 14 of Module 7 of the CEP with her class during August 1996, focusing on the health risks associated with FGC. The CEP is designed so as to not pass judgment on this ancient practice, but simply to inform the population of both the short- and long-term risks associated with the operation. To better facilitate the exchange of ideas in the different modules, traditional African modes of communication and arts, such as theater, are frequently used. Diop recounts the story:

In the beginning, the women weren't very sure they wanted to act out a play based on the story of Poolel. We had kept the name of the girl the same. Being a pulaar name, the ideas was to not implicate Bambaras in the tragedy, which probably helped. The women adapted the story into a play and ended up acting it out, but would refuse to discuss it afterward. I continued to ask them the questions, following the module; no one wanted to respond. The discussions up until now had been very lively. I wondered: Why were they refusing to discuss the subject? Was it because I'm wolof and have not been cut?

We repeated the session three times. After the third, they began, timidly, to talk, and their faces began to brighten up. They said they admired and respected the ancient practice because of the tradition associated with it, and because both men and religious leaders expected it of the women. Nevertheless, their training in personal rights let them understand that they had the right to be healthy, and that they also had the right to express themselves and give their opinions. The women didn't have any knowledge of these rights beforehand and had never spoken of FGC between themselves.

Finally, we got to the point where we talked about it frequently together. The women decided to speak about the harmful consequences on women's health caused by the practice with their "adopted sisters" [a component of the CEP] as well as with their husbands...

They acted out their play in other neighboring communities and decided to bring the women of these communities into their discussion.

The women participants continued over the following months to discuss the subject on their own, outside the classroom. As recounted above by Diop, a curious phenomenon in the form of a methodical, progressive approach to tackling the subject took place: "The discussions were organized in concentric circles. The women began them in their class. The circle enlarged when their adoptive sisters and spouses were brought into the fold. Then, little by little, the circle of knowledge, confidence and courage became bigger."

During this process, the women approached the local imam for his opinion. To their surprise, he informed them that, contrary to their belief, there was no passage in the Quran which supported the practice of FGC. Armed with this information, they continued the discourse using arguments based on their knowledge of the associated health risks, the lack of religious support, and the fact that FGC violates basic human rights such as the right to health and bodily integrity. By June 1997, the community collectively made the decision to organize no further FGC ceremonies: from then on, FGC would not be imposed on the daughters of Malicounda Bambara.

=== Immediate reactions ===
Local Tostan coordinator Malick Guéye learned of the decision later that week and proceeded to inform Molly Melching and others at Tostan headquarters the startling news. The decision was made to publicize the declaration and attempt to jumpstart a national dialogue on the subject. The event of July 31, 1997 was the impetus for a slew of newspaper articles and radio interviews in which the women of Malicounda Bambara were forced to defend their decision. Many spoke out against the declaration as an abandonment of tradition under Western influence; the women countered using their knowledge of universal human rights, contending the practice hindered African development and was an affront to the rights of women and children. Despite the uproar, their argument resonated among other communities and the movement to abandon FGC in Senegal began to spread.

== Impact of the Decision ==
The public declaration of July 31 had immediate effects, especially in the surrounding communities. While some expressed outrage, others also had participated in Tostan's program and wanted to support the decision of Malicounda Bambara.

=== Declaration of Ngeurigne Bambara ===
The women of Nguerigne Bambara followed the same model as those of Malicounda Bambara, applying the same "strategy of communal consensus on three levels: gender, familial and village." A journalist and photographer from the French newspaper Point de Vue were present on November 6, 1997, when the exciseuse (cutter) of the village declared she had stopped performing the procedure after learning that many health problems could be directly linked to FGC.

=== Presidential support ===
Following these two public declarations, President Abdou Diouf threw his support behind the movement during his speech to the 33rd Congress of the International Federation of Human Rights, held in Dakar November 20, 1997, in stating the following:

Whoever says "human rights" must also necessarily speak of women's rights as well. I am convinced that in this domain, we can make equal progress. The Minister of Women, Children and the Family has drawn up a Plan of Action which we must put into motion without further delay. A group of female parliamentarians have also indicated the necessity of modifying our laws in order to reinforce equality between the sexes in various areas such as finance, social services, worker's rights and the family code.

Finally, we must struggle hardily against female genital cutting. A law is no doubt necessary to show that the government is involved in this struggle. But especially, it is imperative that government and non-governmental organizations work together to convince the public that this practice constitutes a danger for women's health. Female genital cutting often results in hemorrhages, infections and even death. Today, this tradition can no longer be justified.

In this regard, the example of Malicounda Bambara deserves special mention. In this Senegalese village, the women became conscious of the dangers of this practice and began a dialogue with their husbands, the imam and the village chief. By collective decision, the community decided that FGC would never again take place in their village.

Today, I solemnly call on all Senegalese for the oath of Malicounda Bambara to flourish in all of Senegal. I ask you to organize a debate on FGC in every village, and that each realize that the time to change these ancient practices has arrived.

Early the following year and with presidential support, Parliament passed a measure outlawing FGC in Senegal.

=== Declaration of Diabougou ===
Led by imam Demba Diawara of Keur Simbara, 50 representatives of 11 villages (Keur Simbara, Bagana, Médina Fajal, Diabougou, Boubacar, Samba Dia, Fajal, Soudiane, Kobongoy, Samb Diallo and Sorabougou) representing more than 8,000 people joined Malicounda Bambara and Ngeurigne Bambara in renouncing FGC on February 15, 1998. Diawara had made an important observation- women and men from villages frequently intermarried, and if the convention of FGC was abandoned only isolated instances, the uncut women of these villages would not be able to find willing spouses.

Shortly after, then-First Lady of the United States Hillary Clinton, accompanying her husband on an official state visit where she received a delegation of women from Malicounda Bambara, Keur Simbara and Ngeurigne Bambara on April 2, 1998. This meeting brought a whirlwind of international attention to the movement to end FGC; the declaration of Diabougou "validated, in some sense, that of Malicounda Bambara and promised future progress."

== 10th anniversary ==
August 5, 2007 saw the 10th anniversary celebration of the declaration in Malicounda Bambara. "Thousands of Africans from four countries commemorated the historic event and announced a five-year campaign for the total abandonment of FGC in Senegal and significant reduction in other African countries. Among the celebrants were participants from the Dec. 3, 2006, declaration in Lalya, Guinea."

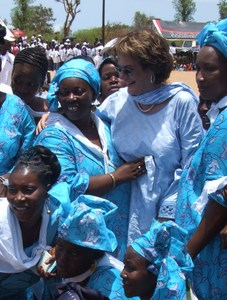
Molly Melching (Tostan) at the 10th anniversary of the declaration of Malicounda Bambara

Reports of the 10th anniversary:

- Villagers ending female genital cutting
- Molly Melching & the Women of Senegal
- UNICEF video of the 10th anniversary of the declaration of Malicounda Bambara

== The FGC Abandonment Movement ==
According to Tostan, as of October 2013 more than 5,600 Senegalese communities previously practicing FGC have declared an end to the practice. Recognized as a best-practice model by the WHO for addressing FGC and adopted by the government of Senegal as the model for its "National Action Plan for the Abandonment of Female Genital Cutting 2009–2015," Tostan's program continues to flourish. Following the spread of the CEP and the resulting community-led movement for change and as of October 2013, a total of 6,778 communities have now taken part in public declarations committing to their abandonment of FGC in Djibouti, Guinea, Guinea-Bissau, Mali, Mauritania, Senegal, Somalia, and The Gambia.
