= METAdrasi =

Refugee aid organization in Greece

METAdrasi - Action for Migration and Development
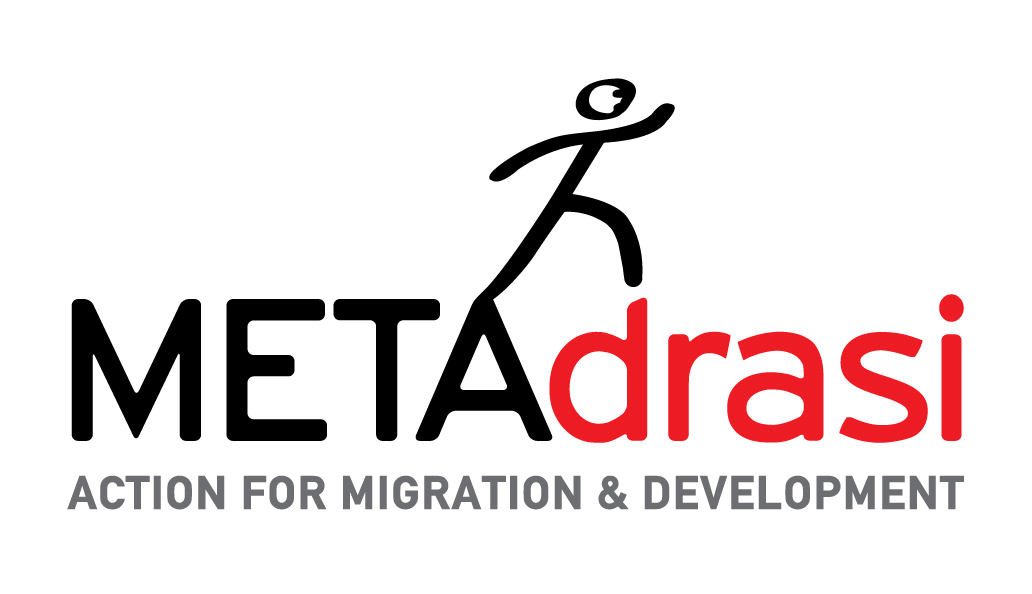
- Founded: December 2009
- Founder: Lora Pappa
- Type: Non-Profit Civil Society Organisation
- Headquarters: Athens, Greece
- Website: www.metadrasi.org

METAdrasi – Action for Migration and Development (Greek: ΜΕΤΑδραση - Δράση για τη Μετανάστευση και την Ανάπτυξη), commonly known as METAdrasi (pronounced: metaðɾasi), is a Greek non-profit civil society organisation that promotes the reception and integration of migrants and refugees in Greece.

The organisation provides interpretation, protection for unaccompanied and separated children, support of other vulnerable groups, and remedial education and integration activities for migrants and refugees.

METAdrasi was founded in December 2009 by Lora Pappa. Since its founding, it has supported nearly one million migrants and refugees in Greece.

== Programmes and Services ==
=== Interpretation Services ===
METAdrasi hosts a network of over 350 interpreters certified by the organization in 40+ languages and dialects. This service facilitates communication for refugees and migrants across Greek healthcare, legal, and social-service settings. As of 2023, the interpretation programme has facilitated 2,201,500 interpretation sessions.

=== Protection of Unaccompanied Minors ===
METAdrasi has been a pioneer for the protection of unaccompanied and separated children through an integrated safety net that includes:

- Accommodation centres on key islands including Chios and Samos
- Safe escort missions from inadequate conditions to safe facilities
- Guardianship services providing entrusted personnel for unaccompanied minors
- Foster care placement with families
- Supported independent living programmes for older minors

In 2019, The Guardian reported the organisation had helped more than 12,000 minors through its programmes. In addition, METAdrasi stands as the main NGO providing guardianship services for vulnerable populations that find themselves in this situation.

=== Education and Integration ===
METAdrasi supports the education and integration of refugees and migrants throughout Greece via educational programmes, Greek language courses, multilingual support guides, and remedial teaching for children. Classes are offered on both an in-person and online basis. METAdrasi is known for its accessibility by providing free-of-charge classes across the islands of Greece as well. For example, in Thessaloniki, the educational programme, Step2School, focuses on remedial education, mathematics, and homework support for children aged 4-18.

In 2021, METAdrasi implemented Akelius, a digital learning interface designed to teach languages to children. It is a multilingual interface, with courses for learning Greek, English, French, German, Portuguese, Russian, Spanish, and Swedish. METAdrasi reports, "Since the launch of the project, 60 schools across mainland Greece and the islands have benefited from this digital tool", and in total, "...over 15,000 students have been supported."

== Mobilization for the 2015 Migrant Crisis ==
The 2015 European Migrant crisis heavily impacted Greece as the preliminary entry point for over 850,000 cases from Syria, Afghanistan, Iraq, etc.. In response, METAdrasi ramped up their operations to account for administrative gaps in services, especially for unaccompanied minors arriving to the country. An organization which had previously focused on interventions via legal aid and interpretations on a local integration level, had expanded into an on-the-ground support effort. Escalated actions included sending interpreters and legal aid to islands with the most influx (like Lesvos and Chios). This concentrated effort helped ease the bottleneck of initial reception meetings of the refugees, providing smooth communication allowing for proper identification. The contribution was recognised by several multi-national entities, resulting in international distinction from entities such as the State of France and the Council of Europe.

== Initiatives Leading to Systemic Change ==
METAdrasi's activities have led to change on an administrative level in the Greek state.

The most notable change came in December of 2020 with the passage of Law 4554/2018. This law passed by parliament established legal structural pillars for utilizing local organizations, guardians, and professional caretakers to look after unaccompanied minors arriving to the country.

Using the existing guardianship framework introduced by METAdrasi, the law made guardianship the official protection measure for unaccompanied minors arriving in Greece.

== Initiatives ==
METAdrasi's Stepping Stone programme (since 2017) is implemented in seven locations (Athens, Thessaloniki, and numerous Greek Islands). This programme provides individualized case management, vocational training, and community-based integration activities to prepare migrants and refugees for the Greek workforce.

The Ready4Business initiative (2023), was developed with the goal of fostering entrepreneurial skills among refugees. Through workshops and one-on-one meetings, participants develop comprehensive business plans while learning about the legal and fiscal business environment in Greece. Notable success stories include:

- Hamza, an Iraqi refugee who established a natural skincare products company
- Brwa Albadwee, who opened a hair salon in Thessaloniki

In 2015, METAdrasi introduced the Foster Care programme for unaccompanied children in Greece. The programme supported the connection of unaccompanied refugee children with reliable foster parents. A core pillar of METAdrasi's intent is providing safe and secure upbringings for unaccompanied children, allowing them to integrate adequately to promote development . Recent outcomes reported between 2016 and 2022, the programme placed 100+ unaccompanied children in homes .

METAdrasi's 18+ Programme, is an initiative designed to support young adult refugees, particularly former unaccompanied minors. As unaccompanied children transition to adulthood, they lose their legal status as minors and can no longer live in youth shelters. To prevent homelessness, METAdrasi provides safe housing, job market integration, and psychosocial support through a network of social workers. The social workers encourage sustained household and financial management and social integration. Lora Pappa, the president of METAdrasi, shared her impetus for starting the program, stating "These young children want to put down roots somewhere, to be given an opportunity and to contribute to society."

== Partnerships ==
METAdrasi maintains relations with:

- UNHCR - Local implementation partner for refugee assistance programmes
- UNICEF - Child educational activities
- Greek America Foundation - Project collaborations
- International Organization for Migration (IOM) - Partnered on the HELIOS+ project. METAdrasi implemented the project in the South Aegean region.

== Awards and Accolades ==
Year	Award	Awarding Body
2015	North-South Prize	Council of Europe
2016	First Prize for Exemplary Partnership in the Public Interest	PILnet's Pro Bono Awards
2018	"NGO of the Year"	Hellenic Responsible Business Awards
2019	Conrad N. Hilton Humanitarian Prize	Hilton Foundation
