= Peter Laugharn =

- Education: Stanford University (BA); Georgetown University (MA); University of London (PhD)
- Employers: Save the Children; Bernard van Leer Foundation; Firelight Foundation; Conrad N. Hilton Foundation
- Organization: Peace Corps (1982–1984)
- Title: President and CEO of the Conrad N. Hilton Foundation

Peter Laugharn is the current president and chief executive officer of the Conrad N. Hilton Foundation. He previously served as the executive director of the Firelight Foundation and the executive director of the Bernard van Leer Foundation. A graduate of Stanford University, Georgetown University and with a Ph.D. in education from the University of London, Laugharn began his career volunteering for the Peace Corps and later worked for Save the Children in West Africa.

== Early life and education ==
Laugharn graduated with a bachelor's degree from Stanford University in 1982. A course on History of education in the United States helped convince him to join the Peace Corps. The professor for the course, David Tyack, had told the students in the class, "You're not a community until you have a school," which Laugharn said inspired his fascination with "education and the potential it gives people to move out of poverty."

In 1982, Laugharn joined the Peace Corps and served as a volunteer in Morocco until 1984. Later in 2011, after the death of Sargent Shriver, the founder of the Peace Corps, Laugharn wrote a tribute to Shriver describing the influence he had in Laugharn's life and choice of career. After the Peace Corps, he earned a master's degree in Arab studies from Georgetown University. He later earned his doctorate in education from the University of London.

== Career ==
Laugharn, after graduate school at Georgetown, began his career working for Save the Children in Mali. He was the deputy director of the organization's operations in the country, and ran the field office in Mali before becoming the education adviser for Save the Children's entire operations in Africa. In total, Laugharn worked for the organization for 11 years.

In 1999, he was appointed as Director of Programme Development and Management of the Netherlands-based Bernard van Leer Foundation. He was later made the executive director of the foundation in 2002. Laugharn left the Dutch foundation in 2008 to become director of programs and then executive director of the Santa Cruz, California-based Firelight Foundation. For seven years, he ran the charity funding education and health programs for people in Africa grappling with the effects of poverty and HIV/AIDS.

Laugharn also co-founded the International Education Funders Group and the Coalition for Children Affected by AIDS. He is a part of the National Advisory Board of Stanford University's Haas Center for Public Service.

In May 2015, Laugharn was appointed a president and CEO of the Conrad N. Hilton Foundation. He succeeded Steven Hilton (Conrad Hilton's grandson), who went on to serve as the chairman of the board of directors for the foundation.
