= Conrad N. Hilton Foundation =

American non-profit charitable foundation

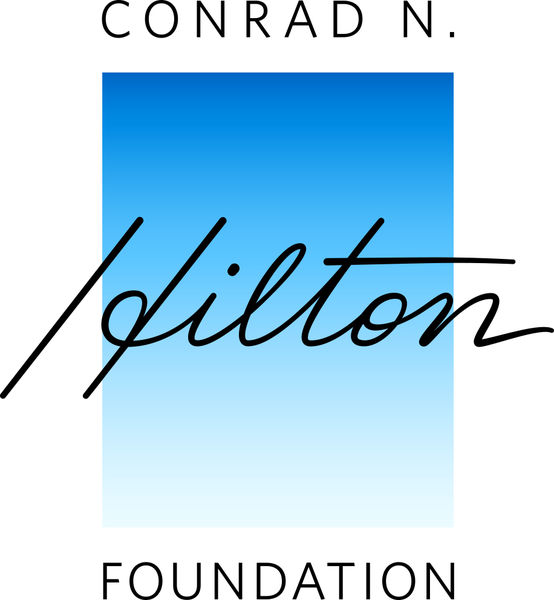
- Founded: 1944
- Founder: Conrad Hilton
- Type: Private foundation (IRS status): 501(c)(3)
- Purpose: Improving the lives of individuals living in poverty and experiencing disadvantage
- Location: Westlake Village, California, U.S.
- Method: Endowment
- Board chair: Linda Hilton
- President and CEO: Peter Laugharn
- Endowment: $7.36 billion USD
- Website: www.hiltonfoundation.org

The Conrad N. Hilton Foundation is an American non-profit charitable foundation, established in 1944 by hotel entrepreneur Conrad Hilton. It remained relatively small until his death on January 3, 1979, when it was named the principal beneficiary of his estate. In 2007, Conrad's son, Barron Hilton, announced that he would leave about 97% of his fortune to a charitable remainder unitrust which names the foundation as the remainder beneficiary.

== Financial information ==
The foundation's assets, as of December 2023, were approximately $7.36 billion. Since inception, the foundation has awarded more than $3.6 billion in grants. In 2024, the foundation paid out nearly $300 million in grants.

== Initiatives ==
The foundation's mission is derived from the last will and testament of Conrad Hilton, which directed the organization to "relieve the suffering, the distressed, and the destitute."

The foundation invests in seven initiatives: Catholic Sisters, Refugees, Safe Water, Foster Youth, Opportunity Youth, Early Childhood Development, and Homelessness. It has additional focus areas of disaster relief and recovery, and aviation.

=== Catholic Sisters ===
The Hilton Foundation Catholic Sisters initiative is focused on recognizing Catholic sisters as leaders in the human development field by supporting organizations and congregations in the United States and Africa.

=== Refugees ===
This initiative works with partners to support solutions facing refugees, migrants and host communities.

=== Early Childhood Development ===
This initiative supports children and caregivers to enable healthy development.

=== Foster Youth ===
This initiative works with nonprofit organizations in Atlanta, Los Angeles, and New York to provide assistance to transition age youth ages 14–26 as they age out of the foster care system.

=== Homelessness ===
The foundation partners with organizations in Los Angeles County to build permanent supportive housing for individuals experiencing chronic homelessness.

=== Opportunity Youth ===
This initiative works with organizations in New Orleans, Los Angeles, Mexico City and Mombasa to offer education, skills training and support.

=== Safe Water ===
This initiative works with international nonprofits and government agencies in Ethiopia, Ghana and Uganda to build water systems.

== Conrad N. Hilton Humanitarian Prize ==
The Conrad N. Hilton Humanitarian Prize is awarded annually by the foundation. It was inaugurated in 1996 and is the largest humanitarian award in the world. Its initial annual award of USD1.5 million was increased in 2015 to $2 million to commemorate its 20th Hilton Humanitarian Prize laureate, Landesa, and in 2020 the prize award was increased to $2.5 million.

=== Conrad N. Hilton Humanitarian Prize laureates ===
- 1996 – Operation Smile
- 1997 – International Rescue Committee
- 1998 – Médecins Sans Frontières
- 1999 – African Medical and Research Foundation
- 2000 – Casa Alianza
- 2001 – St Christopher's Hospice
- 2002 – SOS Children's Villages
- 2003 – International Rehabilitation Council for Torture Victims
- 2004 – Heifer International
- 2005 – Partners in Health
- 2006 – Women for Women International
- 2007 – Tostan Organization
- 2008 – BRAC
- 2009 – Program for Appropriate Technology in Health
- 2010 – Aravind Eye Care System
- 2011 – Handicap International
- 2012 – HelpAge International
- 2013 – ECPAT
- 2014 – Fountain House & Clubhouse International
- 2015 – Landesa
- 2016 – The Task Force for Global Health
- 2017 – International Centre for Diarrhoeal Disease Research, Bangladesh
- 2018 – Shining Hope for Communities
- 2019 – METAdrasi
- 2020 – Homeboy Industries
- 2021 – Camfed
- 2022 – Norwegian Refugee Council
- 2023 – One Acre Fund
- 2024 – Amazon Frontlines
- 2025 – Mines Advisory Group

=== Conrad N. Hilton Humanitarian Prize jury ===
- Leymah Gbowee, founder and president of the Gbowee Peace Foundation Africa
- Zainab Salbi, founder, Women for Women International; TV host; author
- The Right Honourable Helen Clark, former administrator of UNDP; former prime minister of New Zealand
- Conrad N. Hilton III
- Sister Joyce Meyer, PBVM
- Her Majesty Queen Noor
- Kennedy Odede, chief executive officer, SHOFCO
- Dr. Ernesto Zedillo Ponce de León, director of the Yale Center for the Study of Globalization; former president of Mexico

== Leadership ==
Conrad Hilton's granddaughter, Linda Hilton, became chair of the board in January 2024, superseding Hawley Hilton McAuliffe.

Prior leadership includes former chair of the board Steven M. Hilton, who started working at the foundation in 1983 and served as its CEO from 2005 to 2015. In his retirement announcement, he said, "When I joined the Hilton Foundation in 1983, I couldn’t imagine the path that lay ahead. At that time, a handful of staff guided about $6 million in grants annually. Fast forward to today, and we have grown to a staff of over 50 and have awarded over a billion dollars in grants to improve the lives of disadvantaged and vulnerable people around the world."

Peter Laugharn succeeded Hilton, and began his tenure as president and CEO on January 1, 2016.

=== Board of directors ===
As of February 2026

- Linda Hilton (chair), 2014–
- Justin McAuliffe (vice chair), 2019–
- Beverly Hilton-Neapolitan, 2024–
- Conrad N. Hilton III, 2001–
- Jeff Diskin, 2026–
- John L. Notter. 2005–
- Louise Nelson, PBVM, 2024–
- Marc Holley, 2026–
- Michael O. Hilton, 2017–
- Sister Joyce Meyer, PBVM, 2009–
- Hawley Hilton McAuliffe (director emerita), 2006–
- Steven M. Hilton (director emeritus)

== See also ==
- List of wealthiest charitable foundations
- Hilton family
