= Maria Eitel =

American business executive

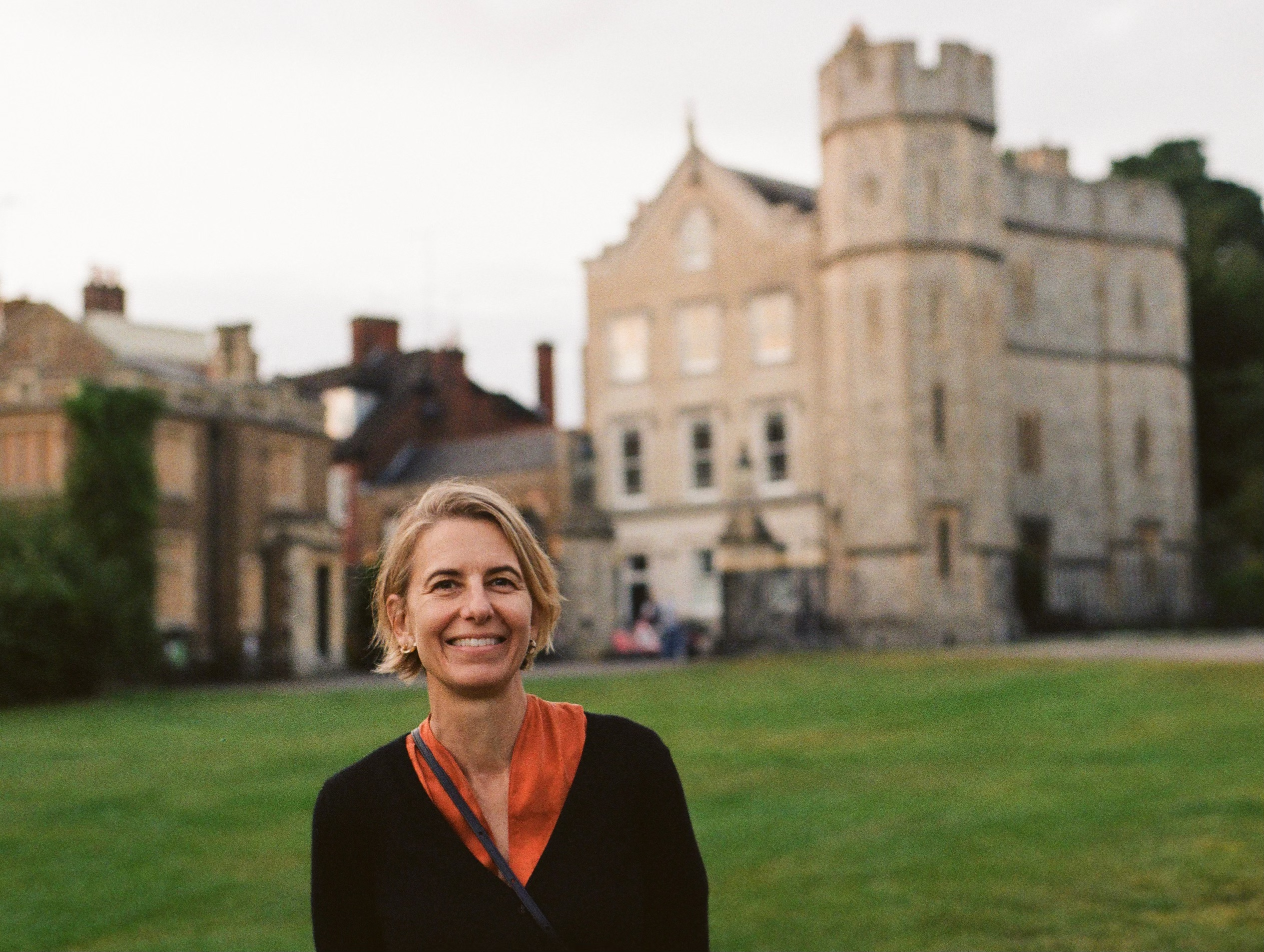
- Born: Washington
- Known for: Chair of the Nike Foundation

Maria Solandros Eitel is the founder and Chair of the Nike Foundation, which supports the work of The Girl Effect, of which she is the founder and chair. Before founding the Nike Foundation, Eitel was the first Vice President for Corporate Responsibility at Nike Inc.

== Early life and education ==
Born and raised in Everett, Washington, Eitel has a BA in Humanistic Studies from McGill University in Quebec in 1983 and later earned a master's degree in Foreign Service at Georgetown University in 1988. In 2001, she completed the Stanford Business School Executive Programme. She holds an Honorary Doctorate of Humanities from Babson College and is a Visiting Fellow of Practice at the Blavatnik School of Government at Oxford University.

== Career ==
=== Early career ===
Eitel began her career as a journalist, serving as a producer for television stations in Seattle and Washington, D.C. before entering public service as a producer for Worldnet, a project of the United States Information Agency. In 1989, she joined the administration of President George H. W. Bush, serving as deputy director of Media Affairs at the White House. In 1992 she was appointed to the role of Special Assistant for Media Affairs to the President George H. W. Bush.

After leaving the White House at the end of the Bush administration in January 1993, Eitel went on to manage communications and public relations at MCI Communications, served as director of Public Affairs for the Corporation for Public Broadcasting, and led Corporate Affairs for Microsoft's European division headquartered in Paris, France.

=== NIKE ===
In 1996, Life Magazine published an article implicating Nike in the use of child labor in Pakistan. Following the findings, Nike hired Eitel as the first Vice President of Corporate Responsibility.

Initial steps to address the sweatshop issue focused on raising the minimum age of workers in Nike factories and improving factory conditions, including the adoption of OSHA clean air standards. Between 1998 and 2004, Nike established a company-wide sustainability policy, committed to donating three percent of pre-tax income to needy communities (including $37.3 million in cash and Nike product in 2004 alone), developed standards for factory monitoring, and became recognized in the field of corporate social responsibility.

==== Nike Foundation and The Girl Effect ====
In 2004, Eitel became founding President of the Nike Foundation.

After a year exploring the Foundation's potential focus, a girl in Ethiopia inspired her to focus the Foundation exclusively on adolescent girls in developing countries. Eitel is credited with creating the theory "The Girl Effect" - based on the idea that adolescent girls have the unique potential to stop poverty before it starts. Eitel leads the Foundation's efforts to put girls on the global agenda with the goal of eradicating global poverty.

Since taking on the role at Nike, Eitel has become a recognized voice on gender equality, featuring in Fast Company's League of Extraordinary Women. President Barack Obama praised her passion "for engaging and mobilizing citizens in social change."

Eitel has worked with numerous partners to support the work of the Nike Foundation, including the Novo Foundation and the Clinton Global Initiative.

In 2010, Eitel and World Bank President Robert Zoellick partnered at a World Bank event on the Adolescent Girls Initiative, challenging partners to expand investments in girls and women as a way to break inter-generational poverty. The next year, the World Bank released a research report supporting Eitel's "Girl Effect" theory entitled "Measuring the Economic Gain of Investing in Girls: The Girl Effect Dividend" which concluded, in part, that if young women were able to participate in the economy at an equal rate to young men, annual GDP growth rates would be as much as 4.4% higher, a difference accounting for nearly $165 billion a year in India, one of the countries studied.

To support the Girl Effect, actress Anne Hathaway traveled to Africa with Eitel in 2011 and co-authored an article for The Daily Beast in 2017. Oprah Winfrey has also shown her support for Eitel and the initiative.

Eitel was referenced in an article in which Yulín Cruz—the mayor of San Juan, Puerto Rico—referenced her role models for female leadership. Mayor Cruz said that she has taken inspiration from this quote from Maria Eitel, "Coming from a position of fear, of not succeeding, losing your job or not being admired handicaps the potential of your career. I've never let fear of losing my job keep me from doing something I knew was the right thing to do."

=== Time's Up ===
In October 2017, following the fallout from the Harvey Weinstein scandal and #metoo, Eitel began moderating the first discussions that led to the formation of Time's Up. Of the meetings, Eitel was quoted in the New York Times as saying, "people were moved so viscerally. They didn't come together because they wanted to whine, or complain, or tell a story or bemoan. They came together because they intended to act. There was almost a ferociousness to it, especially in the first meetings."

On December 15, 2017, Eitel joined with Kathleen Kennedy, Nina Shaw, and Freada Kapor Klein to create the creation of Commission on Sexual Harassment and Advancing Equality in the Workplace. The commission's stated goal is to "tackle the broad culture of abuse and power disparity." It is led by Anita Hill.

On January 1, 2018, Time's Up unveiled an action plan supported by 300 prominent actresses, female agents, writers, directors, producers and entertainment executives. The initiative includes a legal defense fund backed by $16 million in donations, a plan to introduce legislation to penalize companies that tolerate harassment and discourage the use of non-disclosure agreements, and a drive to reach gender parity at studios. It also requested that women wear black to the 75th Golden Globes Awards.

She was a signatory of an open letter that Time's Up published on January 1, 2018, in the New York Times and Spanish-language paper La Opinión in response to a letter of support from the Alianza Nacional de Campesinas (National Alliance of Female Farmworkers).

=== Other affiliations ===
In addition to her position as the chair of the Nike Foundation Board of Directors and the Girl Effect Board of Trustees, Eitel is a member of several boards, including Cloudflare Inc. and GoFundMe, and is an advisor to the MIT Media Lab and the World Surfing League. Her previous board affiliations have included the Eastern Congo Initiative, for which she served as Treasurer, along with the American Hospital of Paris, the Millennium Promise, the World Economic Forum Global Governance Initiative, World Economic Forum HIVAIDS Council, the Stanford University Graduate School of Business Advisory Council, Department for International Development Gender Advisory Group, Lakeside School Board of Trustees, Member of the World President's Association, Millennium Promise Board of Directors, National Academy of Sciences Commission on Labor Standards, SAFECO Insurance, The Acumen Fund Advisory Council, University of Washington Foundation, USAID Advisory Committee on Voluntary Foreign Aid, and the National Academy of Sciences Commission on Labor Standards, Global Alliance for Workers and Communities Operating Board, Business for Social Responsibility (BSR) Board of Directors, Girl Hub Board of Trustees, Initiative for Global Development Leadership Council, Clinton Global Initiative Education Working Group, World Bank Gender Action Group.

Maria is a member of the executive committee to the Seattle Kraken and NHL team.

== Awards and recognitions ==
- In 2012, Eitel was recognized by Fast Company as part of their "League of Extraordinary Women."
- In May 2013, she participated in a Women Deliver Presidential Session on the topic of investing in girls. In July 2013, she delivered the Opening Keynote at the Guardian Activate Summit in London. In September 2013, she delivered remarks at the Google Zeitgeist: Design for Tomorrow plenary session.
- In 2016, she was nominated as CEO of the Corporation for National and Community Service by President Barack Obama, who praised her passion "for engaging and mobilizing citizens in social change".
- In April 2018, she delivered the keynote address at the President's Summit in Copenhagen, Denmark.
- In March 2021, she was entered in the list of Forbes 15 Of The World's Most Inspiring Female Leaders.
- In 2022 received a McGill University, Desautels Management Achievement Award (DMAA).

== Personal life ==
Eitel was married to Michael A. Sheehan, with whom she has a daughter.
