= Malicounda =

Malicounda Communauté rurale de Malicounda
- Rural commune
- Interactive map of Malicounda
- Coordinates: 14°27′41.4″N 16°58′10.4″W
- Country: Senegal
- Region: Thiès
- Department: M'bour
- Arrondissement: Sindia

Government
  - Mayor: Thièwoulé Cissokho

Area
  - Total: 124 km^{2} (48 sq mi)
- Elevation: 12 m (39 ft)

Population (2013)
  - Total: 61,031
  - Density: 492.2/km^{2} (1,275/sq mi)
  - Ethnic groups: Bambara; Fula; Serer; Soninke; Susu; Wolof
- ISO 3166 code: SN-TH

Malicounda is a rural commune (communauté rurale) in the Sindia Arrondissement within the M'bour Department of the Thiès Region in western Senegal. At the 2013 census Malicounda had a population of 61,031 making it the second most populous rural commune after the pilgrimage site Touba Mosquée. Malicounda is also the name of three interconnected villages one of them being Malicounda Bambara, the epicentre of the FGC Abandonment Movement.

== History ==
The rural community of Malicounda was created by decree on 24 July 1972. Following a corruption scandal in 2008 the municipal council was dissolved and replaced by a national special delegation. In violation with public procurement regulations, contracts had been awarded privately without competition. On 10 July 2008 Saly became independent from Malicounda and received city status (commune).

== Geography ==
Malicounda is located 60 km southeast of Dakar and 35 km south of Thiès, in the centre of M'bour Department, making up the northern and eastern suburbs of the cities M'bour and Saly on the Petite Côte. In the north it borders Sindia, in the east Sandiara and southeast Nguéniène. The commune encompasses an area of 124 km^{2} containing the following villages:

Falokh Sérère, Falokh Wolof, Fandane Sérère, Fandane Wolof, Keur Balla Lô, Malicounda Bambara, Malicounda Sérère, Malicounda Wolof, Mballing, Mboulème, Nianing, Pointe Sarène, Roff, Sidibougou, Sintiou Mbadane, Sinthiou Mbadane Peulh, Soussane Bambara, Soussane Sarène, Takhoum Sérère, Takhoum Wolof, Warang Sérère and Warang Socé.

== Demographics ==
As of 2002 Malicounda records having four different ethnic groups:

- 70% Serer
- 15% Bambara
- 10% Wolof
- 4% Fula
- 1% others

== Transport ==
Malicounda is connected by the national road N1, a part of the Trans-Sahelian Highway (TAH 5), with Dakar to the northwest, M'bour to the southeast and with a number of major cities along the whole breadth of Senegal up to Kidira near the Malian border and beyond that all the way to N'Djamena, the capital of Chad and terminal of the TAH 5. In Malicounda there is also an on-ramp of the motorway A2, connecting it with Touba and Blaise Diagne International Airport.
