= Ngaparou =

- Village
- Location in Senegal
- Coordinates: 14°27′47″N 17°3′29″W
- Country: Senegal
- Region: Thiès
- Department: M'Bour

Population (2013)
  - Total: 9,500

Ngaparou (or N'gaparu) is a coastal town with commune status in western Senegal (about 75 km south of Dakar), located in M'Bour Department and Thiès Region on the Petite Côte, near Saly. It is adjacent to the town of Somone and it shares a similar tourist industry, but its main income is from fishing.

== Description ==
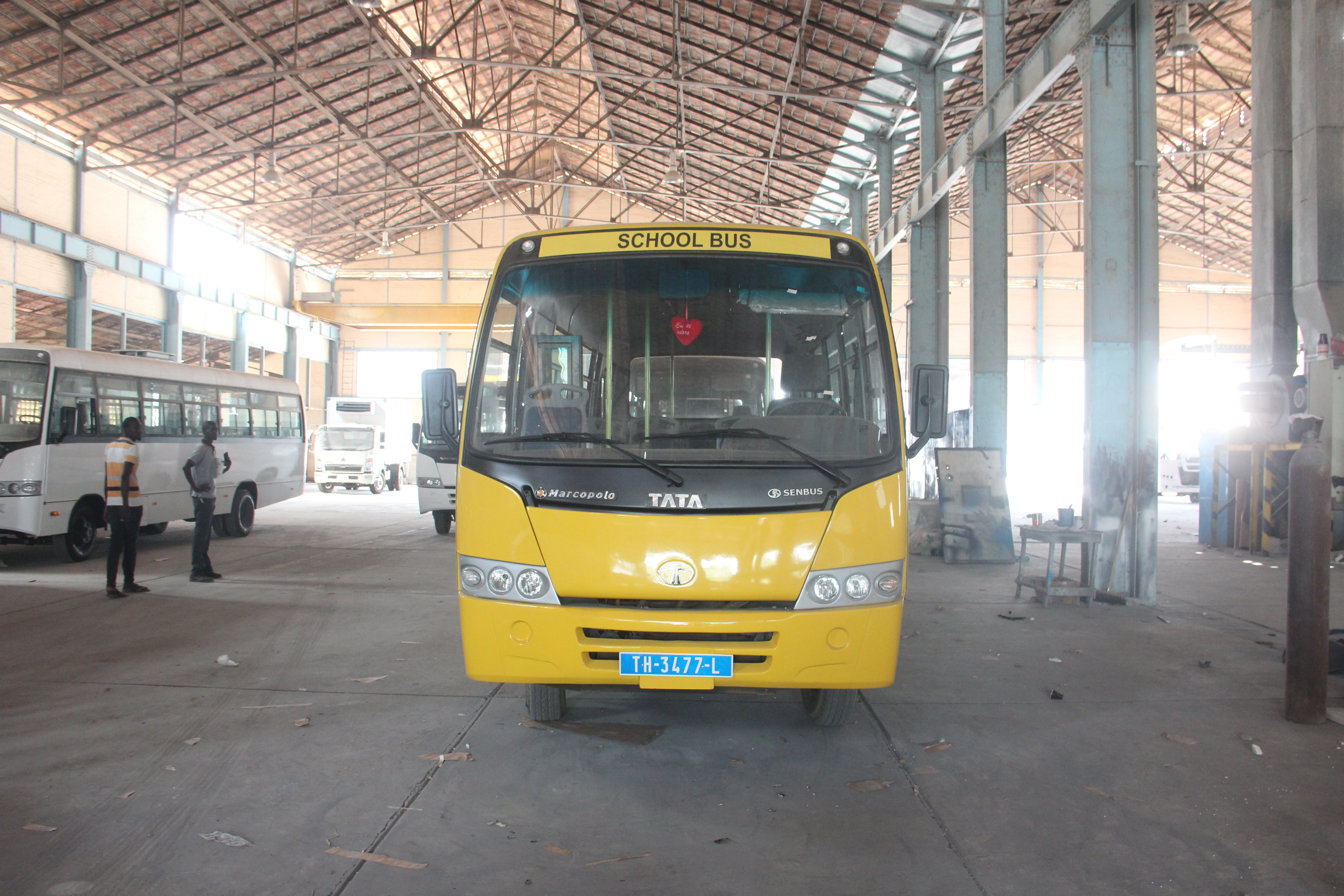
Schoolbus in Ngaparou.

The people of this coastal area are mainly Lebu and the Serer. There are, unusually, Catholic communities here and a Catholic church in Nguering 5 km away.

Ngaparou had 5735 inhabitants and 654 households before the creation of a town in 2004. Today, the town has a population of more than 15,000.

Ngaparou's economy is based on fishing, handicrafts, trade and tourism. It is basically a fishing village which has been opened to tourism in the early twenty century because of its wide beaches and pleasant climate. The town does not have large buildings to accommodate tourists because of local opposition. The fishing industry has been under threat because of illegal overfishing which means that several fish species were no longer available. The fishermen have joined together to plan areas that will not be fished so that stocks can recover. A grant from the World Bank enabled them to purchase refrigerated transport so that their catch can be transported to towns where it can attract higher prices.

Over time fish species that were in short supply have returned to the area. In 2016 it was reported that the weight of lobsters had more than doubled. This is important when fish is 4% of the countries GDP and 50% of the countries protein intake.

Nearby localities are Keur Timak, Somone, Keur Youngar, Nguering and Saly.
