= Optica (Africa) =

Optica Africa
- Trade name: Optica
- Type: Private
- Industry: Optometry, Retail, Optical
- Founded: 1959
- Founder: Bharat Bhardwaj
- Headquarters: Nairobi, Kenya
- Number of locations: 106 branches total (2026)
- Area served: East and Central Africa (Kenya, Uganda, Rwanda, Zambia)
- Key people: Wazeem Mohamed (CEO)
- Products: Ophthalmic lenses, eyeglasses, sunglasses, contact lenses
- Brands: Proprietary: Cactus; Oxygene; Optica; Couture; Licensed: Ray-Ban; Oakley; Tommy Hilfiger; Hugo Boss; Carrera; Emporio Armani; Silhouette; Jimmy Choo
- Services: Clinical vision testing, automated refraction, optical dispensing
- Number of employees: 400+
- Website: optica.africa

Optica Africa (also known as Optica) is a privately owned optical retail and optometry chain headquartered in Nairobi, Kenya. Optica was established in 1959 in Kenya and is among the largest eyewear and diagnostic eye care providers in East Africa. Established a few years before Kenya's independence, the company is one of the oldest and historic enterprises in Kenya. Optica provides optometric services, including comprehensive vision examinations, retail dispensing of prescription eyeglasses, sunglasses, sports glasses, optical frames, and contact lenses.

== History ==
Optica was founded in 1959 in present-day Moi Avenue, Nairobi, by a British-trained optometrist, Bharat Bhardwaj, who previously worked at King George VI Hospital, now Kenyatta National Hospital.

In the 1960s, specialized ophthalmic and optometric services were limited in Kenya and the East African region. The business was initially a single dispensing optician shop managed by five staff. Gradually, Optica expanded into a structured corporate organization.

The founder, Bhardwaj, retired from practice in 2000 and passed on executive operations to Kush Bhardwaj, his son. Bharat Bhardwaj served as the chairman of Optica until his death.

During the 2010s and 2020s, Optica expanded its market by establishing branches in Kenyan urban centers like Mombasa, Kisumu, Nakuru, and Eldoret. Later on, it crossed borders and established retail outlets in Uganda, Rwanda, and Zambia. The company is among the largest optician businesses in East Africa, with 106 branches (June 2026) and about 900 staff across.

== Regional operations ==
Optica is the largest optometry retail enterprise in Kenya and East Africa with 106 branches across the region. The company provides eye health services and products to customers in different geographical markets in Uganda, Rwanda, and Zambia.

=== Kenya ===
The primary and highest-density market for Optica, containing 84 branches located in commercial malls, central business districts, and secondary upcountry towns. Optica is the largest optical retailer in Kenya.

=== Uganda ===
In March 2023, Optica explored the Ugandan market and opened twin flagship stores at The Acacia Mall and Arena Mall in Kampala. There are seven branches in Uganda: six in Kampala and one in Jinja).

=== Rwanda ===
Optica has three branches in Kigali at Kigali Heights, Silverback Mall, and Kigali City Mall. The Kigali City Mall branch provides consultation services and screening in addition to eyewear products including sunglasses, frames, spectacles, and lenses. With a one-time registration fee, customers receive free eye tests for life across all Optica branches.

=== Zambia ===
The company has 12 branches in Zambia: 11 in Lusaka and one in Ndola.

== Products and brands ==
Optica does not manufacture eyewear but imports from global suppliers in Italy, Austria, Dubai, India, South Africa, and China. The company sells both proprietary house brands and licensed international eyewear products. In-house portfolio includes Cactus, Oxygene, Optica, Couture, and Toni Valencia. Additionally, Optica is an authorized regional distributor for global luxury, and performance sportswear brands like Ray-Ban, Oakley, Tommy Hilfiger, Hugo Boss, Carrera, Emporio Armani, Silhouette, Guess, Love Moschino, and Jimmy Choo.

== Partnerships and community health camps ==
Optica works with healthcare providers, schools, churches, and charity groups to provide free eye care clinics and affordable glasses to people and communities in need. In one instance, Optica partnered with Kitengela West Hospital, King David Hospital, and Supreme Dental Care to offer free eye checkups, affordable glasses, and medical referrals. This clinic also engaged a community group called Giants Group Twiga, which donated snacks and supplies for the children who attended.

Through community partnerships, Optica organizes localized medical screening camps for low-income urban residents at Our Lady Queen of Peace Church in South B. It sponsors pediatric vision screenings and prescription frames for students through the Kibera School for Girls (SHOFCO) in Kibera informal settlements. It also supports institutional eye care routines at the Hope for Children’s Home. Additionally, Optica partners with Disability with Concern Awareness (DICOWA) to provide targeted mobility and vision alignment programs for individuals with physical and developmental disabilities.

The company also helps test people's eyesight during large regional health events. Optica joined the Mount Kenya University (MKU) School of Nursing to support a free health camp at Gatitu Catholic Church. Supported by the local county health department, this event provided medical care to about 900 local residents. During the camp, Optica did all the vision tests and supplied the eye testing equipment. Other groups also took part in the event, including Gertrude's Children's Hospital, the Kenya Red Cross Society, Lions Sight First Eye Hospital, and Aga Khan University Hospital.

== Digitalization ==
Optica uses SAP Business One (SAP B1) Enterprise Resource Planning (ERP) software in front-end and back-end channels for paperless transactions. It has a uniform pricing policy, where product costs remain identical regardless of client payment methods. Optica allows the use of various payment methods including cash and mobile money transfers. It has also partnered with health insurance providers who cover for products and service expenses of insured patients.Its branches have visual testing facilities and skilled optometrists who conduct regular eye exams like refraction tests, lens fittings, vision evaluation, and diagnostics.The company has centralized lens surfacing and glazing laboratories to precision-process custom prescriptions.

== Public eye-health ==
In East Africa, shifting demographic and lifestyle patterns like increased urbanization, modern workplace digitization, and changing environmental stressors, have driven up the regional demand for vision and ophthalmic care. Data from the Kenya Ministry of Health estimates that approximately 15.5% of the population requires regular vision care. Public primary healthcare facilities historically face resource limitations in comprehensively integrating refractive error services into the national health framework. Consequently, private providers, including Optica, have increasingly absorbed the public demand for vision screenings and optical corrections by providing multi-tiered pricing systems and expanded eyewear availability.

By expanding retail branches into major urban centers and semi-urban corridors across Kenya, Uganda, Rwanda, and Zambia, Optica has extended diagnostic access and localized early intervention to regional and rural communities.

Deployment of clinical optometry models, regular vision screening checkups, and uniform pricing structures in private optometry providers has adjusted the approach to vision care from irregular and reactive response to routine and proactive screening. The decentralization of optical health services and products supports general public health through early identification, monitoring, and corrective management of visual impairments. This leads to increased community awareness, improved quality of life, and enhanced adult productivity.
