= Optica (software) =

Optica is an optical design program used for the design and analysis of both imaging and illumination systems. It works by ray tracing the propagation of rays through an optical system. It performs polarization ray-tracing, non-sequential ray-tracing, energy calculations, and optimization of optical systems in three-dimensional space. It also performs symbolic modeling of optical systems, diffraction, interference, wave-front, and Gaussian beam propagation calculations. In addition to conducting simulations of optical designs, Optica is used by scientists to create illustrations of the simulated results in publications. Some examples of Optica being used in simulations and illustrations include holography, x-ray optics, spectrometers, Cerenkov radiation, microwave optics, nonlinear optics, scattering, camera design, extreme ultraviolet lithography simulations, telescope optics, laser design, ultrashort pulse lasers, eye models, solar concentrators and Ring Imaging CHerenkov (RICH) particle detectors.

== History ==
Optica was originally developed by Donald Barnhart of Urbana, Illinois, USA, and has been in continual development since 1994. Wolfram Research first sold the original version as a Mathematica application. From 2005 to 2009, Optica Software was sold by iCyt Mission Technology Inc, Champaign, Illinois (renamed Sony Biotechnology Inc in 2010). At iCyt, Optica2 was renamed as Rayica, and Wavica and LensLab were also developed. Later Rayica-Wavica was combined and named back to Optica3. Since 2009, Optica Software has been a subsidiary of Barnhart Optical Research LLC.
