= Keur Simbara =

- Village
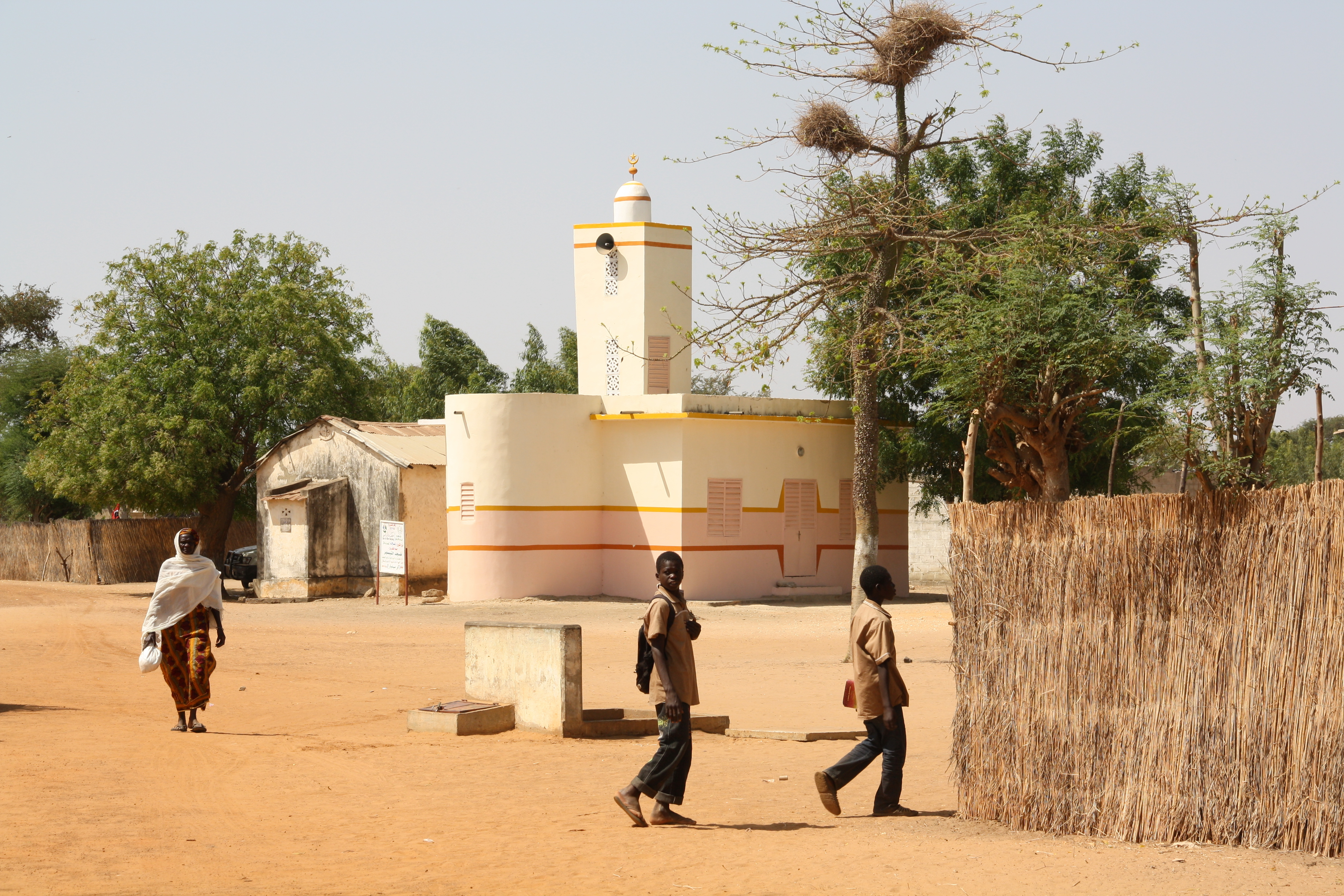
- Country: Senegal
- Region: Thiès Region

Government
  - Village leader: Demba Diawara

Keur Simbara is a small village in the Thiès Region in Senegal. The village is known internationally because of the efforts of its village chief Demba Diawara. He persuaded a group of villages to co-operate to renounce Female Genital Cutting. Diawara believed that in order for Keur Simbara to renounce FGM then he would need to persuade the villages wider social network. This was achieved. Keur Simbara, a small village, has received Ministers from other countries.

== Description ==
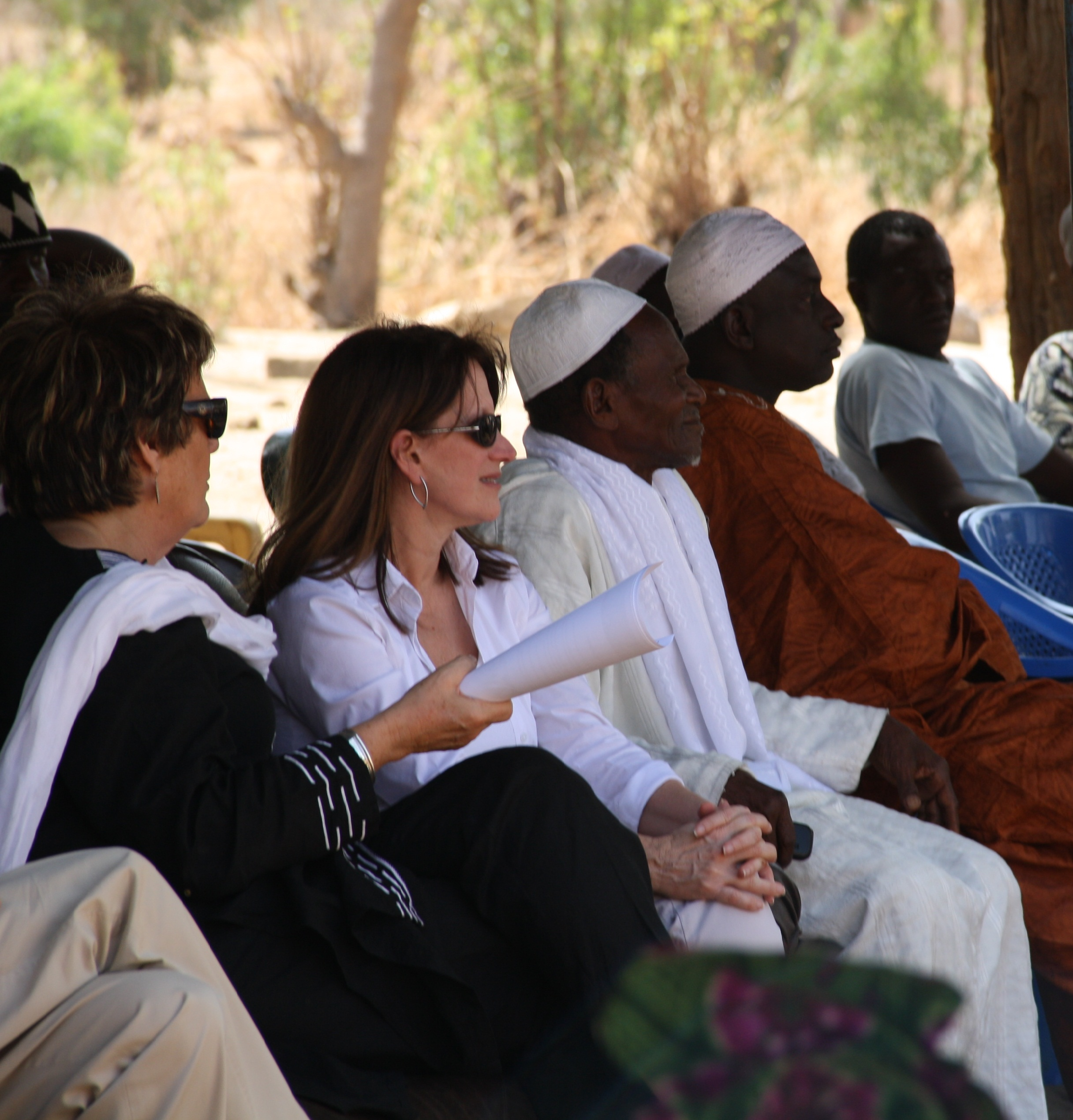
Molly Melching, Lynne Featherstone, Demba Diawara and Khalidou Sy in Keur Simbara in 2013

Keur Simbara is 70 km from Dakar the capital of Senegal. The small Bambara village of Keur Simbara came to international community because of the change that the community has achieved. The village leader Demba Diawara led the village to renounce Female Genital Cutting. The village was aware that another village had publicly committed to abandon female circumcision but they feared that other villagers would refuse to marry their girls they considered the uncut girls to be "unclean". Diawara spent months persuading other villages to join Keur Simbara and this led to a combined announcement at Diabougou. Keur Simbara has received Ministers from other countries and its representatives were praised by their own President and Hillary Clinton.

Women in the village have reported other cultural changes. In the past women were afraid to speak publicly and they would avoid men having meetings. The village reports increased school attendance and birth registration as well as increased vaccination rates.
