= Chhaa Jaa =

- Established: 2019
- Founders: Girl Effect
- Purpose: To educate adolescent girls
- Location: India
- Website: www.chhaajaa.com

Chhaa Jaa (Go Forth and Shine) is a digital-first youth brand in India that aims to help girls build the confidence they need to make choices and changes in their lives.

In 2020, Chhaa Jaa launched "Bol Behen," a Hinglish chatbot providing a safe space for girls to ask questions on sensitive topics like relationships and reproductive health.

They also established the girls-only Facebook community "Bak Bak Gang" in 2019, serving as a safe space for girls to discuss various topics covered in Chhaa Jaa's content.

== Recognitions ==
- UNESCO, UNICEF, WHO, HRP and UNFPA commissioned Chhaa Jaa to serve as a best practice case study for a model for youth-centred digital health interventions released in 2020.
- Digital media series Khullam Khulla won an India Content Leadership Award’ 2020 for 'Best Content in a Digital Media Campaign for a Cause'.

== See also ==
Girl Effect
