= Girl Effect =

Non-profit organization

Girl Effect is an independent non-profit organization, launched in September 2015 with the goal of ending poverty globally.

With the focus on adolescent girls in the Global South, the initiative is attempting to shed light on the exceptional potential these young girls hold on ending world issues.

The organization's framework was inspired by neoliberalism ideologies and the slogan, Girl Power.

== History ==
All over the world, 750 million woman and girls were married before adulthood. This led to early pregnancy, less education opportunity and abuse. In Ghana, 14% of girls in the ages of 15-19 are already mothers and in Ethiopia, 84% of girls do not attend secondary school.

Girl Effect was created in 2004 by the Nike Foundation, in collaboration with the NoVo Foundation and United Nations Foundation. It launched at the World Economic Forum in Davos.

Farah Ramzan Golant was appointed as the CEO. Maria Eitel, President and CEO of the Nike Foundation, was appointed chairman of the organization. In 2019, Jessica Posner Odede replaced Golant as CEO.

It has since become an independent organization.

== Awards ==
- At the Life Ball 2013 in Vienna, Austria, The Girl Effect was awarded the Life Ball Crystal of Hope Award donated by Swarovski, endowed with EUR 100,000.
- Sep 2017 Technology Enabled Girl Ambassadors received an honorable mention in Fast Company’s sixth annual Innovation By Design Awards.

== Critiques ==
This campaign has been the focus of feminist and academic critiques. The campaign was said to rely on essentialist views of womanhood. Further, these types of campaigns that do not take into consideration men and the relations of women and girls with their households and community often have the effect of overburdening women who are already responsible for childcare and all types of formal and informal labor.

Critics have also argued that the organization limits girls in the Global South as subjects and investments for the ideal world, which adopts notions from orthodox beliefs that these individuals are concurrently attempting to dismantle.

== See also ==
Chhaa Jaa
