= Shining Hope for Communities =

Shining Hope for Communities (SHOFCO)
- Industry: Philanthropy, Humanitarianism
- Founder: Kennedy Odede, Jessica Posner Odede
- Number of locations: Currently active in ten slums (2020)
- Area served: Kenya
- Services: SHOFCO Urban Network (SUN) community advocacy platform Water, Sanitation and Hygiene (WASH) Girls Leadership and Education Platform Health Services
- Revenue: 8,551,191 United States dollar (2022)
- Total assets: 53,218,289 United States dollar (2022)
- Number of employees: 500 (2018)
- Website: https://www.shofco.org/

Shining Hope for Communities (SHOFCO) is a grassroots movement based in Nairobi, Kenya providing services, community advocacy platforms, and education and leadership development for women and girls in urban slums. SHOFCO serves more than 350,000 residents in 10 slums across three cities in Kenya.

Famous supporters of SHOFCO include Sibusiso Dlamini, Beyonce, Madonna, Chelsea Clinton, Nicholas Kristof and Abby Disney, alongside Bradley Whitford, Maria Menounos, U.S. Representative Karen Bass, and artist Bradley Theodore.

== Locations ==
SHOFCO currently operates in 10 slums across Kenya: Kibera, Mathare, Mukuru, Korogocho, and Kawangware, in Nairobi; Bangladesh, Mashimoroni, and Maweni in Mombasa; and Obunga and Nyalenda in Kisumu. The majority of their work in these areas is based on the SHOFCO Urban Network (SUN), which is the primary driver of new growth for SHOFCO in these slums.

== History ==
Kennedy Odede grew up in Kibera where he experienced extreme poverty, violence, lack of opportunity, and deep gender inequality. It is because of this experience that in 2004, with just 20 cents and a soccer ball, he started SHOFCO as a movement for the empowerment of urban youth, women, and girls. Odede was inspired by activists Martin Luther King Jr., Marcus Garvey and Nelson Mandela, as well as by women like his mother who suffered consistent abuse but remained strong and driven.

In 2007, Odede met Jessica Posner, an American college student who was studying abroad in Kenya. Together they created the model that SHOFCO uses today. In 2009, Odede and Posner built the Kibera School for Girls, a landmark achievement in the history of the organisation that acted as a base for their female empowerment programme. SHOFCO has expanded their services to include free medical clinics, an innovative aerial clean water system, public toilets, an internet café, as well as economic and community empowerment programs. The aerial water piping system was the first of its kind in Kenya and is in both Kibera and Mathare.

In September 2014, Shining Hope for Communities officially opened SHOFCO-Mathare in Nairobi's second largest slum, Mathare. This site includes another school for girls, a free healthcare clinic and community and economic empowerment programs. SHOFCO has continued to expand and now operates in 10 slums across Kenya.

== Recent Achievements ==
The Conrad N. Hilton Foundation honored SHOFCO as the 2018 Hilton Humanitarian Prize recipient. The prize is the world's largest annual humanitarian award presented to nonprofit organizations judged to have made extraordinary contributions toward alleviating human suffering and working to improve the lives of disadvantaged and vulnerable people throughout the world. SHOFCO became the youngest organization ever to receive the Conrad N. Hilton Humanitarian Prize, a true testament to the impact they have had in such a short amount of time. SHOFCO's 2018 Annual Report included some landmark results for the organization. In their Girls Leadership and Education Programme, 521 girls are enrolled in their two primary schools, with 96% of achieving a pass mark on the 2018 KCPE (Kenya Certificate of Primary Education), with the average mark being a B+, and 100% of Kibera School for Girls (KSG) students transitioning to secondary schools in Kenya and the United States. The Kibera School for Girls also placed #2 in the sub-county for KCPE exam scores. 20 SHOFCO graduates were admitted to prestigious Kenyan boarding schools and an additional three girls were accepted on full scholarship to Buffalo Seminary, the Taft School, and the Brooks School, top boarding schools in the United States.

The SHOFCO Health program provides slum dwellers with access to healthcare. Services provided in these clinics include: primary health and preventative care, pre and postpartum care, child immunizations, comprehensive HIV care, family planning, cervical cancer screening, gender-based violence response, and child nutrition. In 2018, six SHOFCO clinics were operational – five spread across the densely populated Kibera and one in Mathare. SHOFCO reached 289,258 clients, including providing malnutrition screening for 12,874 children and enrolling 850 of these in their malnutrition programme, as well as fully vaccinating 91.9% of children who attended their clinics against diseases.

The Sustainable Livelihoods program: In 2018 SHOFCO provided 4,807 beneficiaries with employability, entrepreneurship and business training, placing 672 youths with internships with 222 employers and training 2,014 with job readiness skills. The program placed young people in the following sectors: non-profit, hospitality, education, information and communication technology, retail, beauty, and fashion design. To enhance the youths’ information technology skills, the program also trained 913 youth from both Kibera and Mathare on basic computer literacy skills and programs.

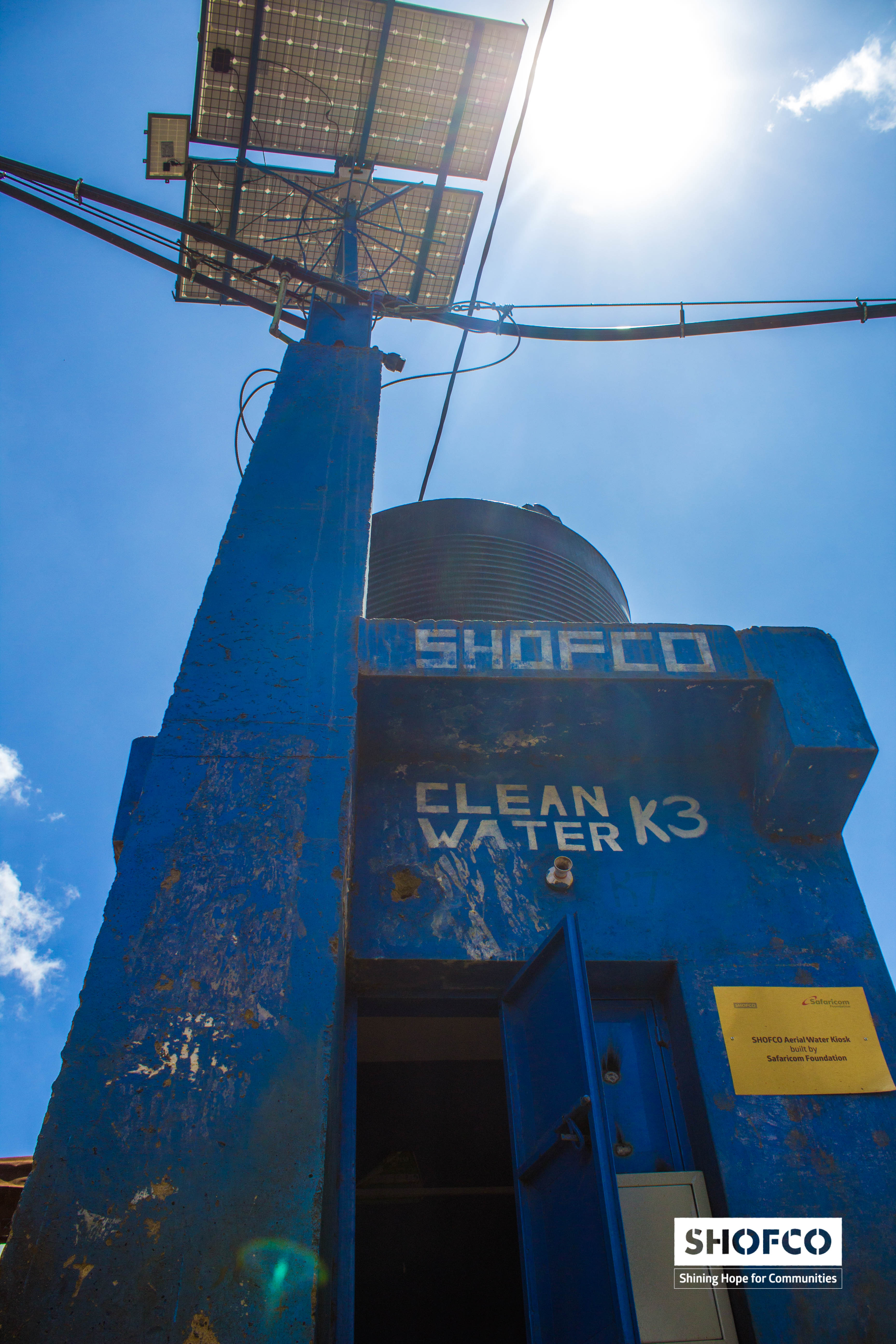
SHOFCO Water Kiosk with aerial piping system and solar panels

SHOFCO also now operates 24 water kiosks across Kibera as part of their Water, Sanitation and Hygiene (WASH) programme. 23 of the kiosks now have cashless payment systems, which work to challenge and undermine the water cartels previously operating in the area to provide clean and affordable water for the community. These water kiosks provided 19,979 individuals with water for themselves and their families. A total of 2,207,420 litres of water were distributed throughout the community.

In 2018, the Gender Based Violence Program was raising awareness and addressing sexual and gender based violence cases (SGBV) in four urban slums: Kibera, Mathare, Mukuru (Nairobi) and Bangladesh (Mombasa). More than 20,000 households were reached with services including information on SGBV prevention, response initiatives, and legal support and referrals. 2018 also saw a formal partnership with the Ministry of Public Service, Youth and Gender Affairs, aimed at a coordinated approach to address SGBV. SHOFCO's SGBV team handled 1,210 cases, including sexual gender based violence, domestic violence, and child abuse. 514 cases were successfully handled and closed. 103 SGBV clients were provided with temporary safe house accommodations. 11 cases were reported and taken to court, with all perpetrators sentenced to life in prison.

The SHOFCO Urban Network (SUN): In 2018, the SHOFCO Urban Network (SUN) reached 75,240 community members. SUN continued to facilitate community groups and peer-to peer savings networks to create an entrepreneurial investment fund for businesses, and micro-life insurance to mitigate the risks of unexpected death that can devastate family finances. SUN also united 801 social welfare groups, issued scholarships to 64 secondary school students and memberships to SUN SACCO membership rose to 1,500 actively saving members, with loans worth KSh 22.3 million (US$223,000) issued.

== See also ==
- Kennedy Odede
