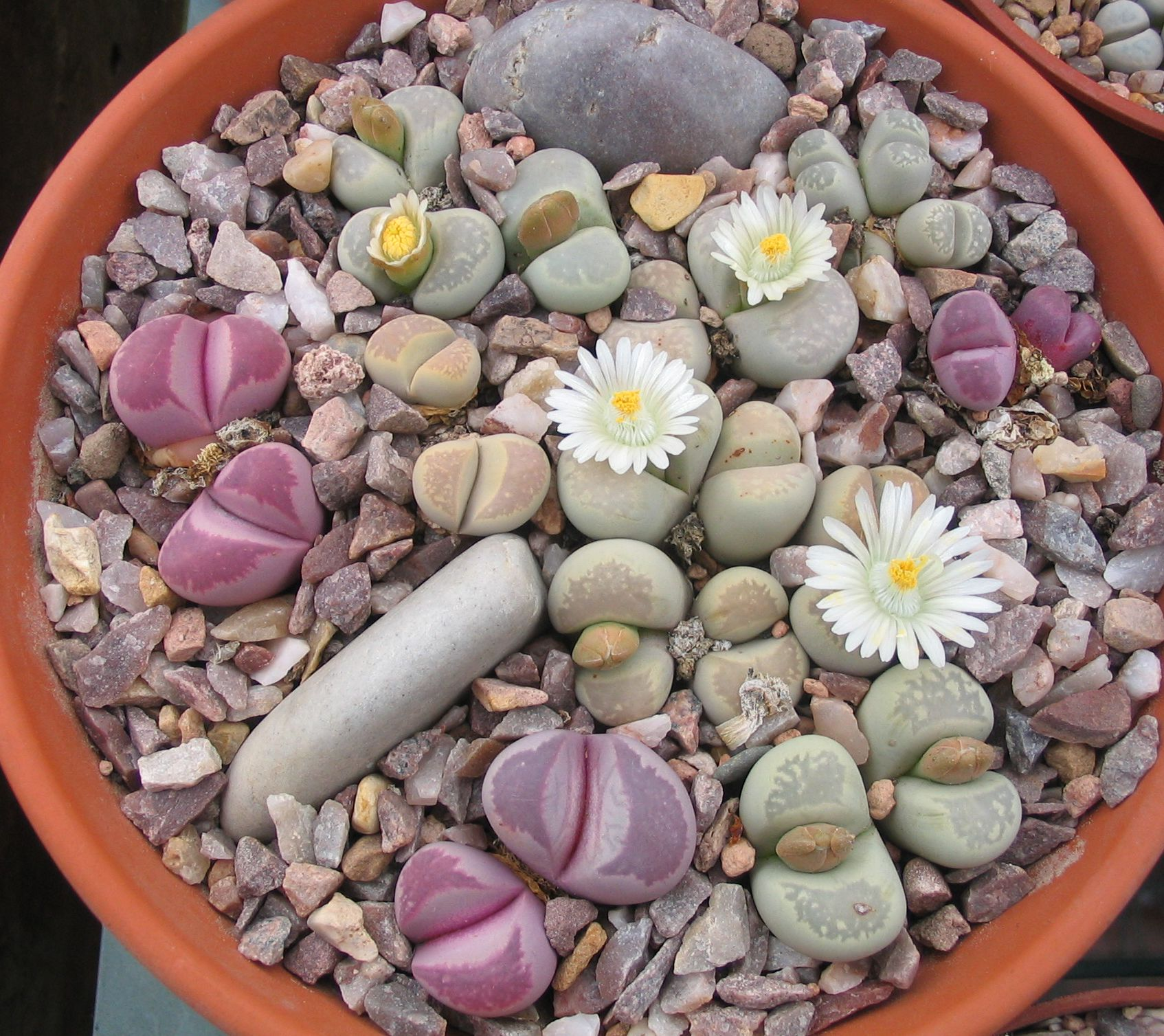

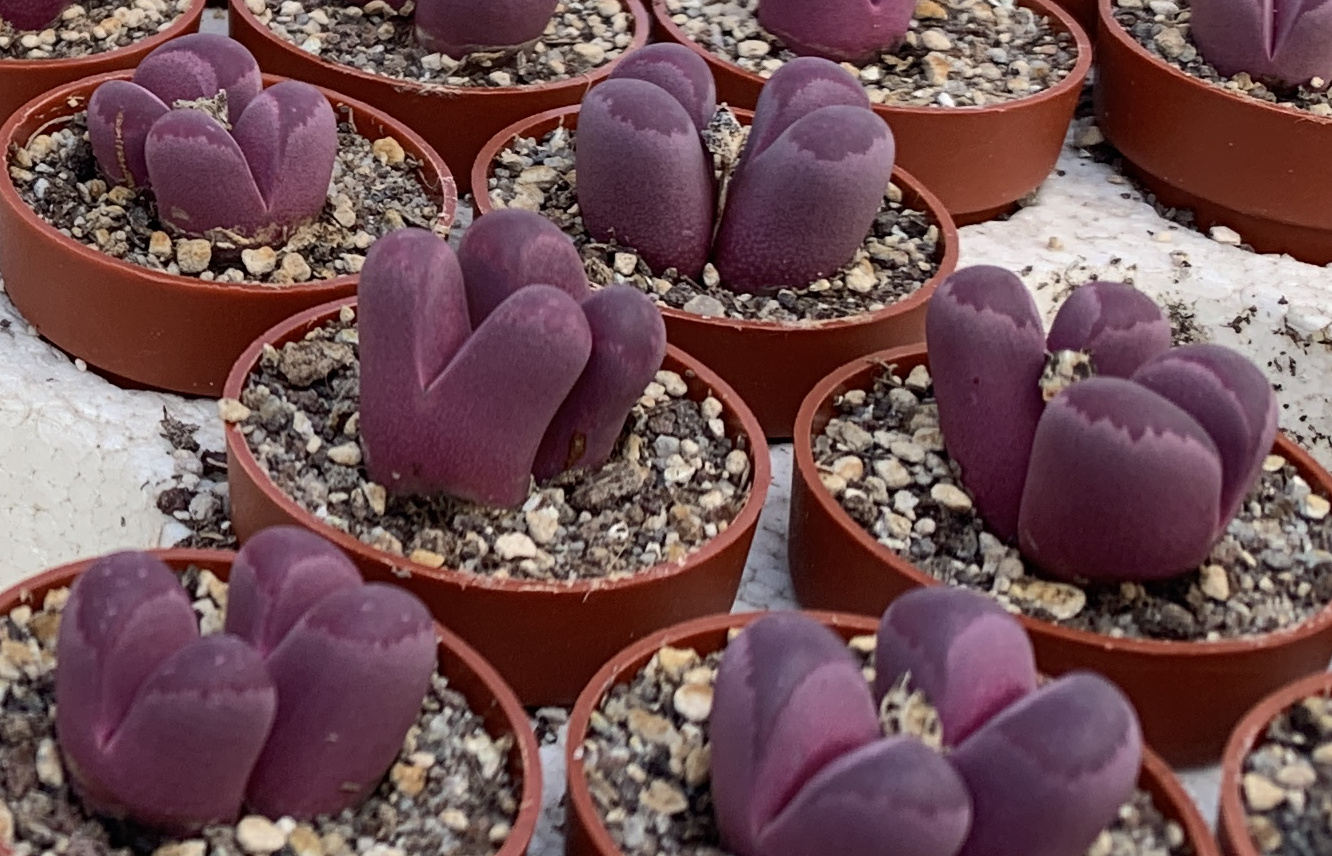

Conservation status
- Critically Endangered (IUCN 3.1)

Scientific classification
- Kingdom: Plantae
- Clade: Embryophytes
- Clade: Tracheophytes
- Clade: Spermatophytes
- Clade: Angiosperms
- Clade: Eudicots
- Order: Caryophyllales
- Family: Aizoaceae
- Genus: Lithops
- Species: L. optica

Binomial name
- Lithops optica (Marloth) N.E.Br.

= Lithops optica =

Species of succulent

Lithops optica is a species of plant in the family Aizoaceae, endemic to Namibia.

== Name and description ==
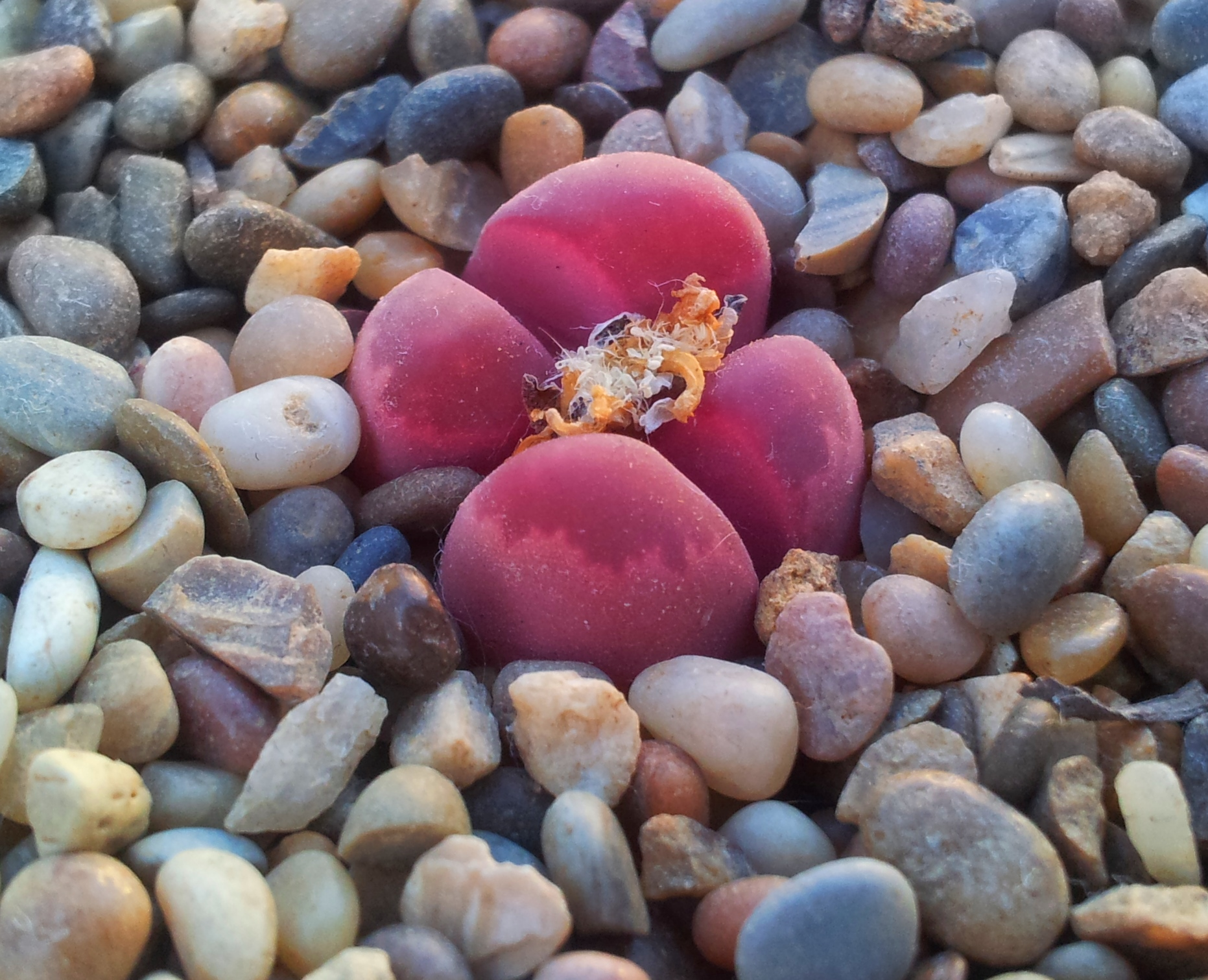
The red "rubra" variety; rare in the wild

The name "optica" means "eye-like" and refers to the rounded windows at the top of the leaves. In habitat, these two leaves emerge just above the surface of the ground.

The well-known and widely cultivated "rubra" variety is a bright purple/red colour. While most specimens of Lithops optica do not have this colour, the "rubra" variety is by far the most commonly cultivated.

== Distribution ==
This species occurs in the coastal areas around Lüderitz, Namibia. This is a very arid "mist-belt" area, with winter rainfall but extremely dry conditions. It is therefore one of the few species of Lithops which is adapted to a winter rainfall climate. Its natural habitat is sandy soil in rocky areas. It is critically endangered due to habitat loss.

== Cultivation ==
Like all Lithops, it requires extremely well-drained soil. Like all Lithops it also grows in annual cycles, as the leaf-pairs flower, and then each produces a new leaf-pair that replaces the old one (which shrivels away). The principal rule of watering is that Lithops should be kept dry from when they finish flowering, up until the old leaf-pairs are fully replaced.
