= Kennedy Odede =

Kenyan social entrepreneur and author

- Education: Wesleyan University (2012)
- Occupations: Founder and CEO of Shining Hope for Communities
- Known for: Activism, Grassroots Organisations
- Notable work: Book: Find Me Unafraid: Love, Loss, and Hope in an African Slum (2015) by: Jessica Posner and Kennedy Odede
- Spouse: Jessica Posner
- Children: Oscar Garvey Odede, Maridad Esther Odede, Zayn Nelson Odede (3)
- Website: https://www.shofco.org/

Kennedy Odede is a Kenyan social entrepreneur and author. Odede is the co-founder and CEO of Shining Hope for Communities (SHOFCO), a movement based in Nairobi, Kenya, and New York, USA.

Odede was awarded the 2010 Echoing Green Fellowship and was named on Forbes under 30 list of top social entrepreneurs in 2014. He is also a member of the Clinton Global Initiative. His work has been featured by President Bill Clinton, Madonna, Beyonce, and by Nicholas Kristof in The New York Times and his book A Path Appears. Odede's writing has appeared in The New York Times, CNN, Project Syndicate and The Guardian.

Odede is a Young Global Leader (YGL) at the World Economic Forum and an Obama Foundation Africa Leader. He is the co-author of the New York Times best-selling book Find Me Unafraid: Love, Loss, and Hope in an African Slum, which he wrote with his wife and business partner, Jessica Posner.

== Early life ==
The oldest of eight children, Odede was born in a small village in Kenya, where he lived until the village was struck by famine when he was two years old. His mother moved the family to the capital city, Nairobi, to seek better living conditions. He became a street child at the age of ten. Encountering a lack of jobs and housing in Nairobi, they ended up in Kibera. Odede lived in Kibera for 23 years. In 2004, he worked in a factory for $0.10 an hour, enough money to start the organization Shining Hope for Communities (SHOFCO). SHOFCO became the largest grassroots organization in Kibera. Without any formal education, Odede received a full scholarship to Wesleyan University in America. Odede graduated in 2012 as the Commencement Speaker with honors in sociology before returning full-time to SHOFCO.

== Career ==
In 2010, Odede was awarded the Echoing Green Fellowship. He was named to the Forbes "30 under 30 list" for top social entrepreneurs and is a member of the Clinton Global Initiative. His work has been featured by President Bill Clinton and Nicholas Kristof in The New York Times. Odede served on the United Nations International Commission for Financing of Global Education Opportunities and on the Board of Directors of Wesleyan University. He is a senior fellow with Humanity in Action and an Aspen Institute New Voices Fellow. He was named a Schwab Foundation Social Entrepreneur of the Year in 2022. He is a Young Global Leader (YGL) of the World Economic Forum. In 2022, he was appointed by Administrator Samantha Power to the USAID Advisory Committee.

== Personal life ==
Odede is the co-author of an autobiography, Find Me Unafraid: Love, Loss, and Hope in an African Slum, that is about him and his wife, Jessica Posner, and their collaboration. In August 2018, they had newborn twins: Oscar Garvey and Maridad Esther. In January 2020, their third child, Zayn Nelson, was born.
