= Sindia (arrondissement) =

- Arrondissement
- Location within Senegal
- Country: Senegal

Sindia is an arrondissement of M'bour in Thiès Region in Senegal.
