= Tostan =

Nonprofit organization

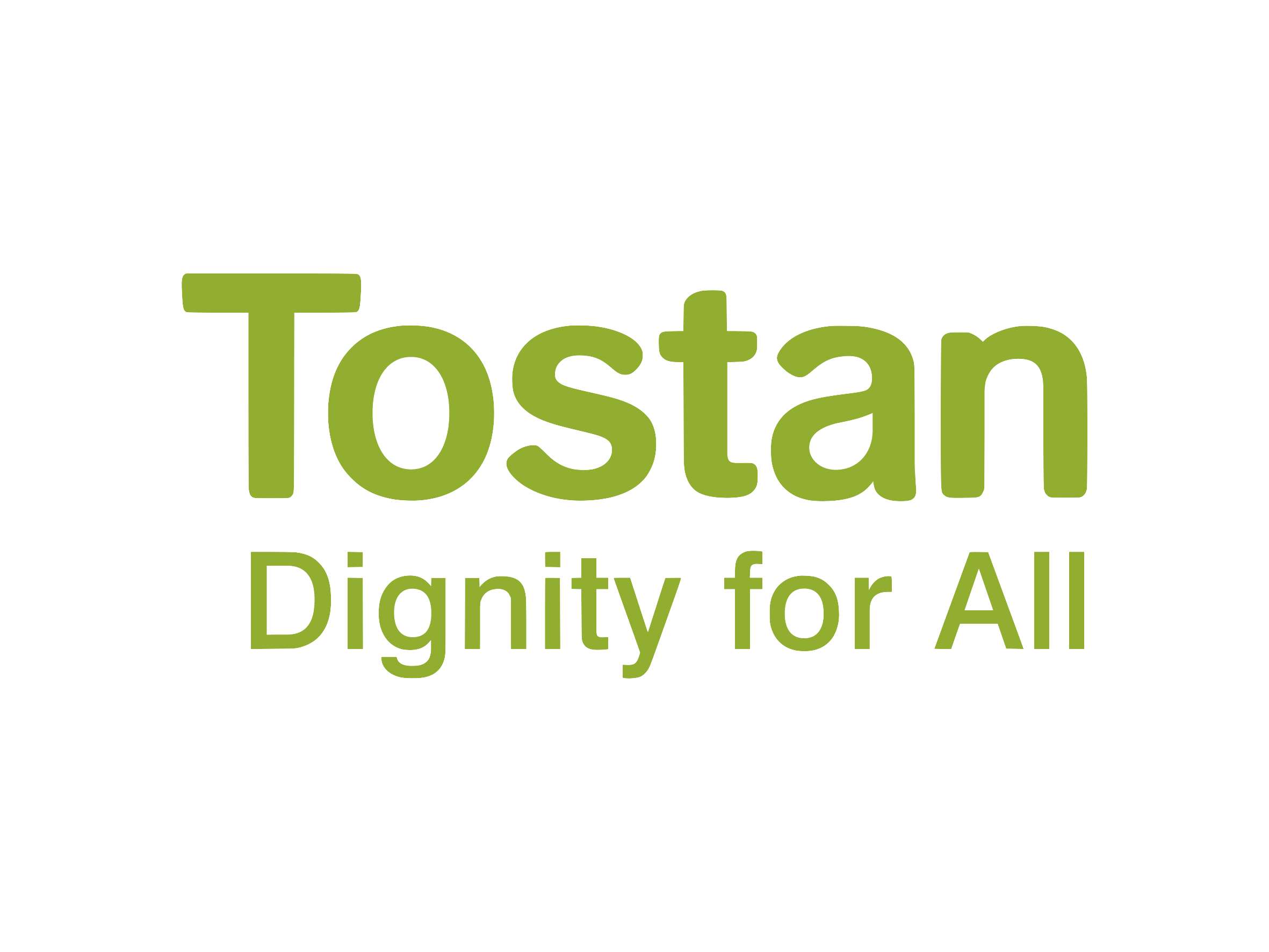
- Founded: 1991; 35 years ago
- Founder: Molly Melching
- Type: NGO
- Location: Dakar, Senegal
- Region served: Guinea, Guinea-Bissau, Mali, Senegal, The Gambia
- Employees: 500+
- Website: tostan.org

Tostan (meaning "breakthrough" in Wolof) is a US-registered 501(c)(3) international non-governmental organization headquartered in Dakar, Senegal. The organization's mission is "to empower communities to develop and achieve their vision for the future and inspire large-scale movements leading to dignity for all" in several West African countries, including Senegal, Guinea, Guinea-Bissau, The Gambia, Mali, and Mauritania.

Tostan takes a holistic, integrated approach to development by facilitating human rights-based, non-formal education programs, most notably the Community Empowerment Program (CEP), which aims to support and empower participants and communities to lead their own development. The organization employs over 500 people and works to foster and promote community engagement in projects relating to literacy, health and hygiene, child welfare, human rights and democracy, environmental sustainability, and economic empowerment.

Although Tostan is best known for its success in accelerating the abandonment of harmful traditional practices, particularly female genital cutting and child marriage, across Africa, the organization has also achieved positive results in the impact areas of governance, education, health, economic empowerment, and the environment, as well as in the intersecting issues of child protection, empowerment of women and girls, and early childhood development. In 2007, Tostan received the Conrad N. Hilton Humanitarian Prize, the world's largest humanitarian prize, for its "significant contributions to the alleviation of human suffering."

== History ==
Tostan was founded in 1991 by Molly Melching, an American educator and human rights advocate, with the original goal of providing non-formal holistic education programming to rural communities in Senegal. Relying heavily on feedback from local communities, Melching and a team of Senegalese cultural specialists developed a program called the Community Empowerment Program (CEP), a curriculum that engages communities by working in their own language and making use of a blend of modern and traditional African methods of learning, such as dialogue, theater, and dance. The program was first launched in 44 Senegalese communities, expanding to 350 by 1994.

Prior to 1997, the CEP contained six modules, covering problem-solving skills, health and hygiene, child mortality prevention, financial management, leadership and group dynamics, and feasibility studies for income-generating projects. In 1997, Tostan added a seventh module on human rights and women's health that also included information about the possible health effects of female genital cutting (FGC). After going through this module, the women of Malicounda Bambara, a village in western Senegal, decided collectively to abandon the practice of FGC, starting a movement that has since led nearly 9,000 African communities to abandon the practice.

Tostan worked exclusively in Senegal until 1997, when it began implementing the CEP in communities in Burkina Faso in a six-year partnership with the NGO Mwangaza Action, which ultimately resulted in 23 Burkinabe communities declaring their intent to permanently abandon FGC. In 2002, Tostan expanded its programmatic offerings for the first time, implementing an initiative called the Prison Project in a Senegalese prison in Thiès, the third-largest city in Senegal and the then-location of Tostan's headquarters. The Prison Project consists of a modified form of the CEP that aims to provide detainees with the resources to help them to develop valuable income-generating skills, restore contact with their families, and reintegrate smoothly into society, thereby also reducing recidivism rates.

During the 2000s, as demand for its programming grew, Tostan continued to expand, opening national offices in Guinea (2003), The Gambia (2006), Mauritania (2007), Guinea-Bissau (2008), and Mali (2009), in addition to now-closed offices in Somalia, Sudan, and Djibouti.

In recent years, Tostan has launched two large-scale campaigns, known as the Generational Change in 3 Years Project (GC3Y) and the Breakthrough Generation Project, in an effort to promote the empowerment of women and girls and the abandonment of harmful traditional practices in West Africa. During the Generational Change in 3 Years Project, which lasted from 2013 to 2016, Tostan implemented the CEP in 150 communities across Guinea, Guinea-Bissau, Mali, and Mauritania, reaching over 9,000 people directly and leading more than 350 communities to abandon FGC, child marriage, and other harmful traditions, in addition to pledging to support human rights. Tostan subsequently launched the Breakthrough Generation Project in 2017, again directly reaching 150 communities over a period of three years in Guinea, Guinea-Bissau, Mali, and The Gambia.

Since 2014, Tostan has been in a partnership with the Bill and Melinda Gates Foundation to improve its monitoring and evaluation systems, and the organization now uses a results framework developed in cooperation with the foundation that measures impacts in five key areas: health, governance, economic empowerment, environment, and education. In 2015, in response to widespread interest in its community-led model, Tostan open the Tostan Training Center (TTC) in Thies to external participants. At the TTC, it offers a 10-day training program on its approach to community-led development in both English and French for community activists, members of local, national and international organizations and governments, and representatives from academia and the media.

In 2017, Melching transitioned from the position of CEO to become the Creative Director of Tostan, and was succeeded as CEO by Elena Bonometti. Under her leadership, the organization is looking to develop effective scaling models for its programs and training seminars, build upon its organization structures in order to support such a move to scale, continue improving results measurements, and explore further research opportunities by developing partnerships at the national and international levels.

=== Work on intersecting issues ===
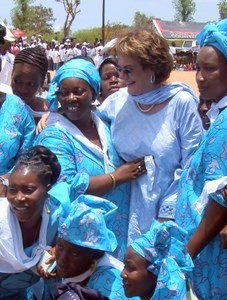
Molly Melching in 2007 on the 10th anniversary of the abandonment of FGM by Malicounda Bambara, Senegal

Although the Tostan program is holistic, Tostan has been widely recognized for its success in accelerating the abandonment of child marriage and female genital cutting (FGC), a tradition that has existed for centuries in most parts of Africa. According to UNICEF, FGC is a "self-enforcing social practice" or social norm to which families feel they must conform in order to avoid being ostracized by their community. In general, FGC is performed on young girls between the ages of two and five, though adolescents also often undergo the practice. Type II female genital cutting (see FGC classification) is the most common type of FGC in West Africa, the region in which Tostan conducts most of its work, though Type I FGC is also performed. Type III FGC, known sometimes as infibulation, is the most severe form and is rare in West Africa.

In 1997, Tostan began providing information about the possible health effects of female genital cutting in the CEP in a module covering human rights and women's health. Tostan had at first hesitated to raise the issue of female genital cutting in its programming, believing it to be too sensitive and liable to undermine its work, but insistence from employees in the field eventually led the organization to include information about the practice.

This new information, together with a newfound understanding of their basic human rights, led the women of Malicounda Bambara, a village in western Senegal, to decide collectively to abandon the practice. They declared publicly before Senegalese and international media in June 1997 that they would no longer cut their daughters. Surrounding communities, angry that they had not been consulted and uncertain about the motives the women had for renouncing the practice, reacted with hostility. An imam from the nearby village of Keur Simbara, Demba Diawara, made it clear to Melching and the Tostan staff that such a monumental social change would be difficult for the women of one village alone to sustain. In areas where FGC is practiced, it is common for a girl to marry into another family that lives in a neighboring village. Because not cutting a girl impacts her marriageability, a community that independently abandons FGC without the agreement of surrounding communities effectively ruins its daughters’ prospects for marriage. As a result, ending the practice in a sustainable way requires widespread agreement among communities whose children intermarry.

After learning himself about the risks of the practice, Diawara decided to walk from community to community in the Thiès Region of Senegal, where Malicounda Bambara and Keur Simbara are located, to raise awareness about the dangers of FGC. In February 1998, thanks in large part to his efforts, 13 neighboring villages declared their decision to join the Malicounda Bambara pledge. Since then, Tostan's approach has successfully encouraged nearly 9,000 communities in Africa to abandon both female genital cutting and child/forced marriage, another harmful practice with which FGC is often associated. The government of Senegal has since adopted Tostan's FGC model and continues to apply it in its work to end FGC in the country. As of January 2019, 5,423 formerly practicing communities have publicly abandoned all forms of FGC in Senegal and many more have done the same across West and East Africa. External evaluators have noted that the pledges made are generally respected by a large majority of community members, though some resistance to abandonment is still present in communities that have declared an end to the tradition.

== Approach ==
Tostan states that its approach follows the philosophy of noted Senegalese scholar Cheikh Anta Diop, who emphasized that the process of development should be educational for everyone involved in the process, NGO workers and community members alike, and that it should be conducted in a way that makes the fullest possible use of existing knowledge and traditions. Tostan therefore conducts its programming in a way that attempts to respect and build on local context, believing that such an approach enables participants to more easily expand their understanding and develop greater insight into their practices and beliefs. All Tostan sessions are conducted in local languages, and facilitators typically come from the same ethnic group as the community they are serving. To date, Tostan's programs have been implemented in 22 different languages, including Wolof, Serer, Fulani, Soninké, Mandinka, Diola, Sousou, Malinké, Pulaar, Kissi, Guerze, Creole, Bambara, Hassaniya, Serehule, Bamanankan, Somali, Afar, as well as French, English, and Arabic.

In order to create a space where participants feel comfortable and safe expressing their opinions freely, Tostan's approach strongly emphasizes democracy and human rights: during the CEP, for example, community members learn about these concepts through ideas that are already present in the community and are visible in their daily lives. In the same vein, Tostan takes a non-judgmental approach when broaching sensitive topics, offering community members the chance to reflect thoughtfully and meaningfully on what they believe and why without self-censoring because of a fear of criticism from outside.

=== Theory of change ===
Tostan's theory of change is based largely on the work of Gerry Mackie, a researcher at the University of California, San Diego who hypothesized in a 1996 American Sociological Review article that female genital cutting, like the practice of foot-binding in China, would end quickly once people began ending the practice collectively in order to preserve a woman's ability to marry within their ethnic group. Tostan, with Mackie's advice and input, has since developed this idea into a wide-ranging theory of change which hypothesizes that FGC can be sustainably abandoned only if both individuals and their extensive social networks are implicated in the decision-making process, as one person or one community alone, given their links to so many other groups and networks, is insufficient to bring the practice to an end regardless of the strength of their conviction that it should be abandoned.

== Community Empowerment Program ==
The Community Empowerment Program (CEP) is the centerpiece of Tostan's programming. It is a three-year, non-formal curriculum based on fundamental human rights that provides participants, adults and adolescents alike, with a strong foundation of knowledge and skills with which to improve their lives and generate effective solutions to community problems. The curriculum begins with human rights learning in a way that is appropriate for the local context, after which participants articulate a shared vision of the future of their community and identify goals to make its realization possible. This happens through a process of dialogue and consensus-building among members of all groups: men and women, elders and youth, members of different social classes, ethnic groups, castes, and religions. The knowledge obtained in program sessions then helps the community to achieve these goals in an organized fashion. Instead of focusing on what is lacking or making value judgments, Tostan asks participants to think about existing community resources and how to build on them. The CEP continues to refer back to human rights throughout the course of the program.

The program is divided into two phases: the Kobi (meaning "to till the soil" in Mandinka), which contains modules on democracy, human rights, problem-solving skills, health and hygiene, followed by the Aawde (meaning "to plant the seed" in Pulaar), which contains modules on local language literacy, small enterprise development, and basic numeracy. Teaching methods consist of interactive exercises, such as small-group work, case studies, and action-research projects. These methods draw on modern and traditional African oral techniques, including theater, storytelling, dance, artwork, song, debate, and the sharing of personal experiences.

Tostan believes that the collective changes made by villagers must be self-sustaining. To this end, Tostan helps establish Community Management Committees (CMCs) that implement development efforts proposed by community members after the program's end. The CMCs are composed of 17 democratically selected members, at least nine of whom are women, and all receive training from Tostan on how to perform effectively in their positions and on the role participatory decision-making methods can play in their work.

Tostan uses the feedback it receives from participants and local leaders, both religious and secular, to regularly update and revise its programs, embracing an approach that emphasizes adaptation and adjustment based on the needs of learners, the socio-cultural context of the area, and program design elements, making it possible for the organization to expand more easily into new countries and cultural contexts. Tostan also values external research and supports external reviewers in carrying out their evaluations.

=== Changes to the CEP ===
Over time, new modules have gradually been integrated into the CEP. Since 2009, the Jokko Initiative, which teaches participants how to use a mobile phone to send messages, both as a means of communication and as a way of practicing their recently acquired literacy skills, has been integrated into the CEP in all communities with adequate cell coverage. Tostan considers the use of mobile phones and SMS texting an effective method of accelerating positive social transformation by connecting communities, amplifying the voices of women, youth, and marginalized groups, and providing a platform for the exchange of ideas.

Past external evaluations of Tostan have found instances where community members were not able to make full use of the information gained during Tostan's programming because of a lack of resources and infrastructure. In an effort to address this shortcoming, Tostan offers Community Development Grants of between US$300 and 1,000 to CMCs and individuals during and after the CEP, which are often used either to fund community development projects or to start a community rotating microcredit fund. These funds can enable people, notably women, to launch their own income-generating activities, helping them to support their families and give back further to their communities, in addition to giving them the chance to make use of the knowledge and skills gained over the course of the CEP. The funds are controlled and distributed by the CMCs, which decide interest rates and the length of loans that they will grant.

The Child Protection module, designed in 2010, provides special training for Community Management Committees on how to handle issues that relate to the well-being of children. It aims to build consensus around children's rights while simultaneously building awareness of the various moral, social, and legal norms that affect children.

In 2013, a new project called Ndimaagu (Pulaar word for 'dignity'), was piloted in 55 communities in Tambacounda, a city in the southeast of Senegal. The project integrates additional classes on gender into the CEP, offers trainings on violence prevention for local authorities, traditional and religious leaders, and builds partnerships between Community Management Committees, non-governmental organizations, governmental institutions, community leaders, and service providers responding to gender-based violence in Senegal.

In 2017, Tostan piloted a new module called Bridging the Gap, which aims to foster closer relationships between local communities and newly decentralized local government structures in Senegal. With the support of UNICEF, Tostan led trainings in local languages for local government officials on human rights and responsibilities, corruption, good governance, and local-level budgeting, while also adding a training for Community Management Committees on how to best collaborate with local government to ensure community needs are responded to in local budgets.

== Other programming ==
Tostan offers several additional programs to communities that have successfully completed the CEP. These programs aim to help communities retain the knowledge gained in the CEP and contribute to the development of conditions in which that knowledge can be put to its fullest use. The Peace and Security Project (P&S) was launched in April 2012 and seeks to establish links between community-led initiatives promoting peace and regional policy makers, in order to contribute to peace and security at all levels. This module expands the CEP's core program to include conflict analysis and prevention, mediation and communication techniques, and the role of women in peace and security. It has since been implemented in Senegal, Guinea-Bissau, and Guinea.

The Reinforcement of Parental Practices (RPP) module, which aims to help parents and the wider community stimulate early childhood brain development in order to better prepare children for school, was first implemented in 232 communities in Senegal in 2013. The module tries to overcome certain social norms and traditional practices which have been shown to hinder the brain development of infants. Many West Africans in both rural and urban areas believe that infants must be protected from dangerous spirits, and, in order to protect them, certain parents avoid looking newborn babies in the eye and speaking regularly and directly to them, actions which recent advances in neuroscience have shown to be crucial to the development of intellectual faculties in young children. Over the course of the RPP Module, "facilitators share...techniques that enrich interactions between parents and their young children and are all linked to children’s basic human rights to education and health. These techniques include speaking to their young children using a rich and complex vocabulary, asking their children questions and helping them respond, playfully copying their children, telling them stories, and describing objects in detail to them." The RPP Module was evaluated by researchers from Stanford University in 2016, which showed, among other results, that children whose caregivers had gone through the RPP Module had increased the number of their utterances by 32% more than their peers in control settings, and it was also found that children in RPP communities made significantly greater gains in language milestones and expressive vocabulary than children in non-RPP communities.

Through the Solar Power Project, in partnership with the Barefoot College in India, Tostan has given rural African women who have completed the CEP the opportunity to train as solar power engineers. Following six months of training at the Barefoot College, the women return home with skills that enable them to bring power to their communities and earn an income for themselves and for their Community Management Committee. From 2009 to 2016, 25 Tostan participants attended classes at the Barefoot College, including 13 women from Senegal, five from Guinea-Bissau, 5 from Djibouti, and 2 from The Gambia.

=== Modified CEP Programming ===
Tostan offers two modified versions of the CEP. Known as the Prison Project and the Youth Empowerment Program, these programs are aimed at groups that ordinarily would not have access to the traditional CEP but who can still benefit from the curriculum. The Prison Project was first launched in 1999, and it aims to help detainees reintegrate back into their communities, which it accomplishes by building their knowledge of human rights and equipping them with practical skills to launch income-generating activities. Tostan also facilitates family mediations to help integrate former detainees back into their communities upon release. The Youth Empowerment Program typically takes place in urban areas, where the curriculum of the CEP is adjusted to make it more relevant to young people going through the education system and searching for employment, helping them to develop the skills needed to be successful.

== Partners, awards and recognition ==
Tostan's donors include the Greenbaum Foundation, the Swedish International Development Cooperation Agency (SIDA), UNICEF, UNFPA, USAID, the Wallace Global Fund, and the William and Flora Hewlett Foundation, among others.

In August 2007, Tostan received the UNESCO King Sejong Literacy Prize. In September 2007, Tostan was awarded the Conrad N. Hilton Humanitarian Prize for its "extraordinary contributions toward alleviating human suffering." In 2010, Tostan and its founder Molly Melching were recognized by the Skoll Foundation with the Skoll Award for Social Entrepreneurship. Tostan received an 'Award in Action' by the Cécilia Attias Foundation for Women in 2012, recognizing their work in improving health systems and maternal care at a community level. In 2013, Molly Melching was honoured with a 'Women of Impact' award at the 4th Annual Women in the World Summit. In 2002 Melching received the Sargent Shriver Distinguished Humanitarian Award from the National Peace Corps Association for her work with Tostan; it is awarded to returned Peace Corps volunteers who continue to make a sustained and distinguished contribution to humanitarian causes at home or abroad or are innovative social entrepreneurs whose actions will bring about significant long-term change.

== See also ==
- Female genital mutilation
- Molly Melching
