= Molly Melching =

Senegalese activist

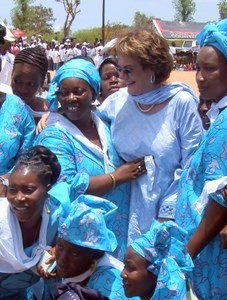
Molly Melching in 2007 on the 10th anniversary of the abandonment of FGM by Malicounda Bambara, Senegal

Molly Melching is the founder and Creative Director of the Tostan Community Empowerment Program (CEP). Tostan (meaning "breakthrough" in the Wolof language) is a non-governmental organization (NGO) headquartered in Dakar, Senegal whose mission is to empower African communities to bring about sustainable development and positive social transformation based on respect for human rights. Her website, Tostan.org, states "Tostan implements a holistic, three-year empowering education program in African national languages that has engaged over 3,500 rural communities in eight African countries on themes of democracy, human rights, health, literacy, and project management skills". These themes include the abandonment of female genital cutting, the abolishment of child/forced marriage, and female empowerment in leadership positions such as leadership positions in countries across West and East Africa.

Melching's expertise is in developing educational materials for use at the community level in Africa, and she helped create the Tostan Model- the informal three-year education program that remains inclusive and promotes awareness of environmental sustainability. Melching's work along with that of Senegalese communities has also contributed to several innovative community development and communication techniques including the model of organized diffusion of information and the use of the public declaration for the abandonment of FGC and child/forced marriage.

== Early Work in Senegal ==
While a student at the University of Dakar in 1974, Melching developed an interest in working with children. She wrote an illustrated children’s book, Anniko, which was published by the New African Editions (NEA). In November 1976, she joined the Peace Corps on an individual placement to continue developing and publishing books for Senegalese children tailored to their culture and environment. To accomplish this, Melching created the "Demb ak Tey" (Yesterday and Today) Center, which opened in the African Cultural Center, and served street children in the most populated area of Dakar, the Medina. Using songs, stories, proverbs, theater, and other oral African traditions, Melching and her Senegalese team promoted children's literature pertaining to West African culture. Seeing the popularity of traditional African stories and their potential as a vehicle for education, Molly began a weekly radio program in Wolof, a major national language of Senegal. By including messages on health and the environment, the radio program reached thousands of families with relevant information for improving their lives.

In 1982, Melching was awarded a grant from the Spencer Foundation to continue her activities, which encouraged her to remain in Senegal. She moved the children's center to the village of Saam Njaay in the region of Thiès. In collaboration with community members and with funding from USAID, she and her Senegalese team developed a basic, nonformal education program for rural populations based on their traditions and culture.

Melching began collaborating with UNICEF Senegal in 1988 to improve and expand this nonformal education program to other languages and regions of Senegal. Melching focused on women’s distinctive need for literacy training and other kinds of basic education. With UNICEF’s support, the program was extended to thousands of women throughout the country and was also adapted for at-risk, out-of-school adolescents using a basic life skills approach.

== Creation and Work With Tostan ==
In 1991, Melching took the collective lessons and pedagogies developed in Saam Njaay and created a 501(c)(3) nonprofit organization, Tostan. Tostan's centerpiece is the program Melching and others developed in Saam Njaay, Senegal: The Community Empowerment Program. The Community Empowerment Program (CEP) is targeted at both adult and adolescent learners and is always delivered in local languages. The nonformal education approach is based on human rights and is divided into two modules: the Kobi (meaning "to till the soil"), covering democracy, human rights, problem-solving skills, health, and hygiene; and the Aawde (meaning "to plant the seed"), covering local language literacy, small enterprise development, and mathematics.

Over the years, the CEP continued to evolve. Recent additions have been integrated into the CEP, including the Reinforcement of Parental Practices Module, which works with parents to stimulate early childhood development and better prepare children for school, and the Peace and Security project, which seeks to establish links between community-led initiatives promoting peace, and regional policymakers.

Tostan participants have begun health and hygiene improvement projects leading to the reduction of maternal and infant mortality rates. Furthermore, change has been incited through the reduction of violence against women; dramatically increased rates of vaccinations and pre and post-natal consultation; and led campaigns to enroll girls in school and register thousands of children who had no official birth certificates. They have even begun implementing income-generating activities. Women now participate in decision-making processes and are emerging as leaders.

On July 31, 1997, one group of Tostan participants from the village of Malicounda Bambara decided to abandon the ancient practice of female genital cutting (FGC) in their community. Their decision was motivated by the understanding that FGC is harmful to the health of girls and women, violates their human rights, and is not in accordance with their religious and cultural values. As of November 2016, over 7,700 communities in the countries Tostan works have publicly declared their abandonment of FGC and child/forced marriage, including 23 villages in Burkina Faso in partnership with the NGO Mwangaza Action. FGC continues to be practiced in 28 countries of Africa and is required in many ethnic groups for girls to marry and become respected members of the community.

== Distinctions and recognition ==
1995: UNESCO chose Tostan as one of the most innovative education programs throughout the world and published a brochure on the Tostan experience.

1997: Mrs. Hillary Clinton, wife of former President Bill Clinton, visited a Tostan village; this led to both Mrs. Clinton and former President Clinton paying a special visit to the Tostan Headquarters a year later.

1999: Molly Melching was awarded the University of Illinois Alumni Humanitarian Prize

2002: Ms. Melching received the Sargent Shriver Distinguished Award for Humanitarian Service at the 40th Celebration of the Peace Corps.

October 2003: The World Health Organization chose Tostan’s education approach as a “Best Practice Model” for community development and ending FGC, calling for further replication and distribution of the model to other African nations.

2005: Tostan won the Anna Lindh Prize for Human Rights

2007: Tostan won two awards: the UNESCO King Sejong Prize for Literacy and the Conrad N. Hilton Humanitarian Prize, the largest humanitarian prize in the world.

2010: Tostan was recognized by the Skoll Foundation with the Skoll Award for Social Entrepreneurship.

2012: Tostan received an ‘Award in Action’ by the Cécilia Attias Foundation for Women, recognizing their work in improving health systems and maternal care at a community level. Molly Melching was presented with a ‘Women of Impact’ award at the 4th Annual Women in the World Summit in 2013.

2013: Molly Melching was presented with a "Women of Impact" award at the 4th Annual Women in the World Summit in 2013

2015: Molly received the Thomas J Dodd Prize in International Justice and Human Rights for her work with Tostan. She was also awarded the Jury Special Prix in Individual Philanthropy from the BNP Paribas Foundation, and the 2015 University of Illinois Humanitarian Award.

Additionally, Ms. Melching received the "World's Children's Honorary Award" for her revolutionary fight against forced marriage, girls' circumcision, and child marriage in West Africa.

== However Long the Night ==
A book about Melching’s work, However Long the Night: Molly Melching’s Journey to Help Millions of African Women and Girls Triumph, was written by Aimee Molloy and published on April 30, 2013. The book shares Melching’s personal experiences that brought her to Africa nearly 40 years ago, the inspiring people she has met along the way, and why she decided to stay. It also recounts Tostan’s founding and the community-led movement for transformative social change being seen in Africa.
