= William Winston =

William Winston may refer to:

- William Henry Winston (1789–1859), American planter and builder of the William Winston House in Alabama
- William D. Winston (Virginia politician) (c. 1791–1858)
- William D. Winston (Texas politician) (1932–2007)
- William Samuel Winston, better known as Bill Winston (born 1943), American preacher, author, and entrepreneur

== See also ==
- William Winston Seaton (1785–1866), American journalist and Mayor of Washington, D.C.
