= Hurricane Alicia =

Category 3 Atlantic hurricane in 1983

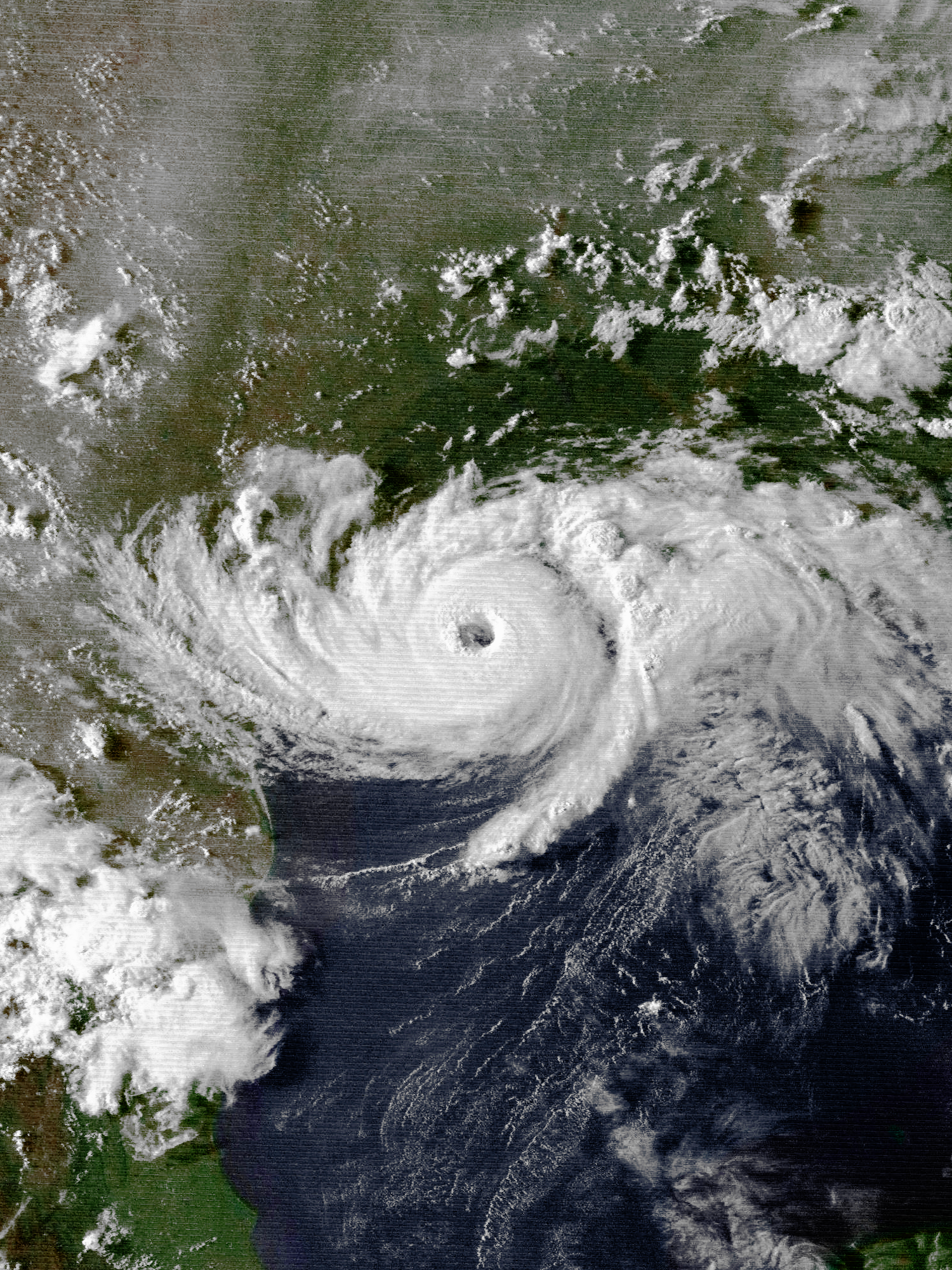
- Hurricane Alicia rapidly intensifying off the coast of Texas on August 17

Meteorological history
- Formed: August 15, 1983
- Extratropical: August 20, 1983
- Dissipated: August 21, 1983

Category 3 major hurricane
- 1-minute sustained (SSHWS/NWS)
- Highest winds: 115 mph (185 km/h)
- Lowest pressure: 962 mbar (hPa); 28.41 inHg

Overall effects
- Fatalities: 21
- Damage: $3 billion (1983 USD) (Costliest tropical cyclone on record at the time)
- Areas affected: Texas; Louisiana; Oklahoma
- IBTrACS
- Part of the 1983 Atlantic hurricane season

Hurricane Alicia was a small but powerful tropical cyclone that caused significant destruction in the Greater Houston area of Southeast Texas in August 1983. Although Alicia was a relatively small hurricane, its track over the rapidly growing metropolitan area contributed to its $3 billion damage toll, making it the costliest Atlantic hurricane at the time. Alicia spawned from a disturbance that originated from the tail-end of a cold front over the northern Gulf of Mexico in mid-August 1983. The cyclone was named on August 14 when it became a tropical storm, and the combination of weak steering currents and a conducive environment allowed Alicia to quickly intensify as it drifted slowly westward. On August 17, Alicia became a hurricane and continued to strengthen, topping out as a Category 3 major hurricane as it made landfall on the southwestern end of Galveston Island. Alicia's eye passed just west of Downtown Houston as the system accelerated northwestwards across East Texas; Alicia eventually weakened into a remnant area of low pressure over Oklahoma on August 20 before they were last noted on August 21 over eastern Nebraska.

Alicia was the first hurricane to make landfall on the United States since Hurricane Allen struck South Texas in August 1980 over three years prior, ending the longest period of the twentieth century without a landfalling hurricane on the U.S. coast. Alicia's approach precipitated the evacuation of 60–80 thousand people from coastal communities along the coasts of Southeast Texas and Louisiana. Along the coast, a 12 ft (3.7 m) storm tide flooded communities, with the rough surf sinking several ships and resulting in three offshore fatalities. Most of the damage attributed to the storm was caused by strong winds estimated to have peaked at 130 mph (210 km/h) in southwestern Galveston Island. Alicia was the first major hurricane to form in the Gulf of Mexico since Hurricane Anita of 1977.

Widespread damage was wrought in Galveston and Houston, where thousands of homes were destroyed. In Downtown Houston, nearly all skyscrapers saw the loss of approximately half of lower-level windows, littering the urban streets with debris. Widespread power outages and flooding impacted much of Southeast Texas, with observed rainfall totals peaking at 9.95 in (253 mm). In addition to the strong winds, rough surf, and heavy rain, Alicia also generated 22 tornadoes centered around the Houston–Galveston area; most were rated F0, but the strongest, rated F2, tore through Corsicana further north.

The impacts of Alicia tapered inland past the point of landfall, though the weakening system still produced damaging winds and flooding in the Dallas–Fort Worth metroplex and Oklahoma; light rain associated with Alicia was observed as far north as Michigan. In total, Alicia caused 21 fatalities and 7,288 injuries.

== Meteorological history ==
Map plotting the storm's track and intensity, according to the Saffir–Simpson scale Map key Saffir–Simpson scale Tropical depression (≤38 mph, ≤62 km/h) Tropical storm (39–73 mph, 63–118 km/h) Category 1 (74–95 mph, 119–153 km/h) Category 2 (96–110 mph, 154–177 km/h) Category 3 (111–129 mph, 178–208 km/h) Category 4 (130–156 mph, 209–251 km/h) Category 5 (≥157 mph, ≥252 km/h) Unknown Storm type Tropical cyclone Subtropical cyclone Extratropical cyclone, remnant low, tropical disturbance, or monsoon depression

The origin of Hurricane Alicia can be traced to a frontal boundary that extended from New England to the Gulf of Mexico. This weak front was initially stationary over the Southeastern United States but moved slowly southward into the north-central and northeastern fringes of the gulf, producing strong convective activity beginning on the night of August 13, 1983. On August 14, a small area of low pressure developed on the western end of the front and moved off the coasts of Mississippi and Alabama, intensifying as it progressed further into the open gulf waters. The thunderstorms associated with the small low-pressure area—described as a mesoscale convective complex—aided in the development of additional storms in the northern Gulf of Mexico by facilitating favorable conditions for convective initiation. By the evening of August 14, the disturbance had largely separated from the parent frontal trough and continued to organize around a surface-level circulation. A United States Air Force reconnaissance aircraft investigated the precursor system and determined that it had developed into a tropical depression at 12:00 UTC (7:00 a.m. CDT) on August 15 while 160 mi (260 km) south of New Orleans, Louisiana. Within six hours of developing, the disturbance intensified further into a tropical storm, attaining the name Alicia and becoming the hurricane season's first named storm. Due to Alicia's formation in a region with high environmental pressures, the storm remained relatively small throughout its lifetime. The presence of a ridge of high pressure to Alicia's north steered the nascent tropical cyclone slowly westward in the early part of its development. The ridge eventually drifted eastward, resulting in Alicia slowly curving towards the northwest beginning mid-day on August 16.

The storm's slow movement—averaging just 5 mph (8 km/h)—and lack of strong steering currents allowed Alicia to reap highly favorable conditions characterized by warm sea surface temperatures in excess of 84 °F (29 °C) and favorable winds in the upper troposphere due to an upper-level anticyclone, resulting in unabated intensification until landfall. Radar analyses indicated that Alicia was stationary at times as it transitioned to a northwesterly heading. An eye began to emerge on satellite imagery by the afternoon of August 16. On August 17, Alicia strengthened into a hurricane with its pressure falling at a steady 1 mbar (hPa; 0.03 inHg) per hour. At 06:00 UTC (1:00 a.m. CDT) on August 18, Alicia became a major hurricane and made landfall an hour later on Galveston Island—25 mi (40 km) southwest of Galveston, Texas—with maximum sustained winds of 115 mph (185 km/h) and a minimum barometric pressure of 962 mbar (hPa; 28.41 inHg) as measured by aircraft reconnaissance, making it a low-end Category 3 on the Saffir–Simpson hurricane wind scale. Alicia was the first hurricane to strike the continental United States since Hurricane Allen moved ashore South Texas in August 1980, ending the longest break in contiguous U.S. hurricane landfalls of the 20th century. The hurricane was also the first major hurricane to impact the Greater Houston area since Hurricane Carla in 1961.

Alicia at peak intensity just after landfall on the morning of August 18

Alicia weakened as it accelerated northwest into the Texas interior, with the hurricane's center passing just west of Downtown Houston on the morning of August 18 as a Category 1 hurricane; the storm was initially slow to weaken as it was able to rein in moist air from the warm Gulf of Mexico. Later that day, the continued inhibitory impacts of friction and dry air weakened Alicia to a tropical storm near College Station, Texas, and degenerated into a tropical depression early on August 19 near the Dallas–Fort Worth metroplex. Despite having remained over land for 36 hours, Alicia remained well-organized while tracking into Oklahoma on August 20. The tapering system transitioned into an extratropical cyclone later that day; these remnants persisted for another day before they were absorbed by a passing trough over eastern Nebraska on August 21.

== Preparations ==
Hurricane Alicia marked the first time the National Weather Service provided local interests with landfall probabilities, beginning 60 hours before Alicia's eventual landfall. The new information was generally well received by local officials, though a slight uptick in landfall probabilities for the New Orleans area was interpreted by a local radio station to have denoted a change in Alicia's course, resulting in the unnecessary transition of two local hospitals to emergency operations. The first gale warnings and hurricane watches were issued for the United States Gulf Coast between Corpus Christi, Texas and Grand Isle, Louisiana at 16:00 UTC (11:00 a.m. CDT) on August 16. Coastal areas from Corpus Christi, Texas, to Morgan City, Louisiana were issued hurricane warnings shortly after Alicia intensified into a hurricane on August 17; these warnings remained until the storm weakened into a tropical storm over East Texas. The National Weather Service office in Galveston suspended operations after water began to flood the office at the height of the storm.

Between 60 and 80 thousand people were evacuated from Brazoria, Chambers, Galveston, and Harris counties in advance of Alicia, as well as 1,500 persons from Sabine Pass. Twenty thousand people sought refuge at shelters within Houston. Another 6,000 evacuated from Cameron Parish, Louisiana. Offshore oil operations were postponed in preparation for Alicia with the evacuation of 1,360 workers, most of whom were from Shell platforms. Initially, however, residents did not take the warnings seriously. Galveston Mayor E. Gus Manuel, against the advice of Texas Governor Mark White, ordered the evacuation of only low-lying areas. As a result, only 10 percent of the population living behind the seawall chose to leave when Alicia came ashore. In contrast, about 30 percent of Galveston's population evacuated the island when Hurricane Allen threatened the eastern Texas coastline in 1980. Throughout the day, however, as the increasing winds began to cause damage in Galveston, people grew more concerned. The mayor finally ordered a widespread evacuation of the island after midnight on August 18, but by then, the bridges to the mainland were uncrossable.

== Impact ==
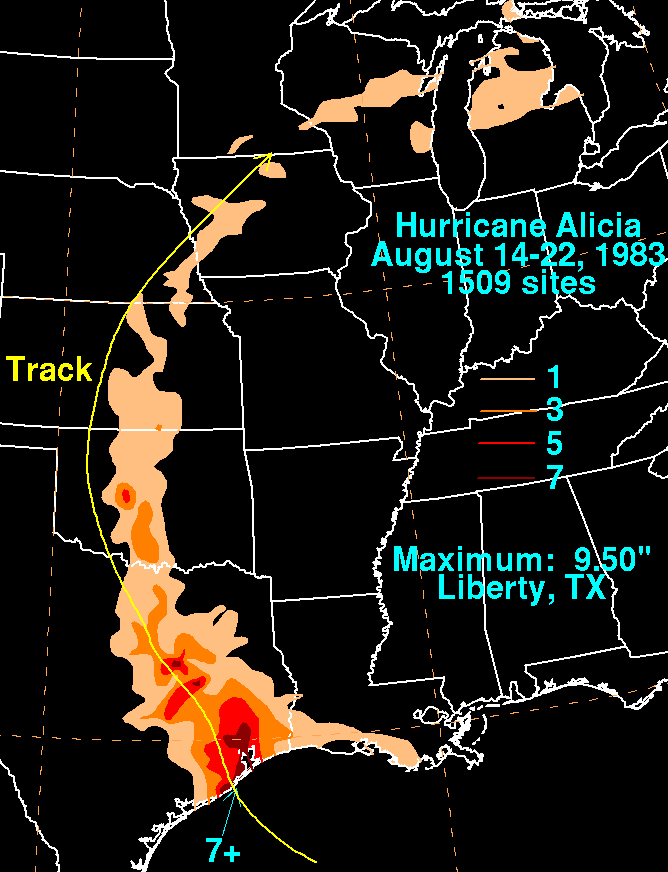
Rainfall swaths from Hurricane Alicia's trek into the Central US Plains and Midwest

Hurricane Alicia caused US$3 billion in damage, making it the costliest tropical cyclone in U.S. history at the time; insured losses were estimated at US$700 million by the American Insurance Association. There were 7,288 injuries, including 21 fatalities and 25 hospitalizations. Despite being a relatively small and low-end Category 3 hurricane, the impacts of Alicia were exacerbated in the Houston metropolitan area due to a rapid increase in population, resulting in a rise in potentially susceptible infrastructure that also induced as much as 10 ft (3.0 m) in land subsidence along some stretches of Galveston Bay.

=== Texas ===
==== Houston and Galveston areas ====
Alicia produced a 12 ft (3.7 m) storm tide that crested along the interior coast of Galveston Bay near Baytown, Texas. A 300-home subdivision near Baytown sustained extensive damage to most dwellings. Seabrook, Texas also documented a 12 ft (3.7 m) storm tide, with slightly lower tide heights of 7.5 ft (2.3 m) occurring at the Flagship Hotel in Galveston. The rough surf eroded as much as 250 ft (76 m) of beach in western parts of Galveston Island. A recently constructed levee system protecting Texas City mitigated potential storm surge damage to the city's extensive industrial infrastructure. However, an oil spill resulting from a ruptured tank near Galveston Bay swept through areas near the Texas City Dike. A tug capsized 50 mi (80 km) south of Sabine Pass, resulting in one death and the eventual rescue of four crewmembers five days later. Another two deaths resulted from the sinking of two shrimp boats in the Clear Lake, Texas area. In total, about 400 shrimp boats sustained some form of damage or sunk, resulting in $7 million in losses. Major damage was wrought to 80 other large vessels.

A 60–70 mi (97–113 km) stretch of the Texas coast experienced hurricane-force winds. The strongest gust was reported in Galveston where a 102 mph (164 km/h) gust was recorded near landfall, though stronger gusts likely occurred over more sparsely populated coastal areas; no surface observations were documented along southwestern Galveston Island where Alicia made landfall. Analysis of structural damage suggested that gusts as high as 130 mph (210 km/h) were produced by Alicia over land. Nearly every structure in Galveston County, Texas sustained varying degrees of damage from torn roofing to total destruction with the most severe damage occurring in western parts of the county. Telecommunications and power on Galveston Island were downed for several days. The walls of some hotels collapsed and numerous windows facing the wind were blown out. Storm surge damaged most buildings in Jamaica Beach, Texas, with 50 homes sustaining major damage. Heavy rains nearing 8 in (200 mm) totals on the island caused street flooding and destroyed a mobile home community. Significant wind damage occurred on the inland portions of Galveston County, including damage to schools, apartment complexes, and mobile homes. In League City, Texas, damage was estimated at $100 million, largely stemming from roof damage.

Seven people were killed in Harris County, Texas as a result of fallen trees, drownings, or automobile crashes. Another 1,530 people were injured. At Houston's William P. Hobby Airport, sustained winds peaked at 81 mph (130 km/h) with gusts to 99 mph (159 km/h). The airport sustained $1.5 million in damage, including damage to several small aircraft, hangars, metal structures, and airport windows. Tropical storm-force winds of 51 mph (82 km/h) gusting to 78 mph (126 km/h) at the Houston Intercontinental Airport; there, two terminal roofs experienced minor damage and one airplane broke from its ties. Fifty cars on site suffered shattered windows. Skyscrapers in Downtown Houston suffered extensive damage from wind-blown debris accelerated by the narrow spaces between buildings. The lower 40 floors of most skyscrapers were shattered by wind-blown gravel. Similar debris or water blocked over 20 major roads; flooding caused by the widespread 5–8 in (130–200 mm) rainfall was most severe in Baytown, Clear Lake, and Pasadena in the eastern part of Harris County, necessitating the rescue of roughly 300 people. Thirty of these rescues arose from a single subdivision in Baytown where inundation reached a depth of 10 ft (3,000 mm). In these communities, hundreds of homes were flooded. Ninety percent of homes were damaged in Crystal Beach, Texas, of which half were destroyed. Alicia also caused $4.5 million in cotton losses and $6 million in pecan crop losses in Harris County. Total damage to public property in the county was estimated at $46 million. Johnson Space Center escaped significant damage, though 200 nearby trees were toppled by the strong winds and a few facility doors and windows were damaged.

==== Elsewhere in Texas ====
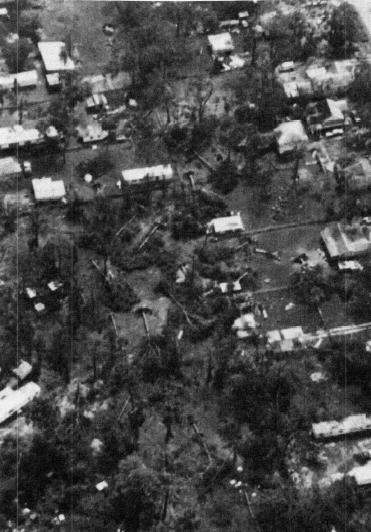
Possibly tornado- or microburst-induced damage between Hitchcock and Bacliff photographed from a National Oceanic and Atmospheric Administration helicopter

Relatively less severe damage along the Texas coast between High Island, Texas and Sabine Pass, Texas where structures generally sustained roof and window damage but most remained intact. Coastal roads were flooded by storm surge and numerous power lines were downed. In Chambers County, Texas, Alicia caused $24 million in damage and the loss of 30–50 percent of the county's rice and soybean crops. More than 200 homes were flooded, forcing residents into shelters. Damage was significant on the southern end of Bay City, Texas, where several homes were destroyed. Heavy rains from Alicia caused localized flooding in Southeastern Texas under a wide swath of ≥5 in (130 mm) rainfall. The highest rainfall totals were largely east of the hurricane's center with a secondary maximum farther east along the Texas–Louisiana border near Orange, Texas. The highest measured rainfall total occurred at Greens Bayou, where 9.95 in (253 mm) of rain fell. The Pine Island Bayou in Hardin County, Texas overflowed its banks and adjacent areas remained inundated for a week after 3–5 in (76–127 mm) of rain fell across the county. Floodwaters blocked roads in Jefferson County where Cow Bayou and the Neches River overflowed their banks. Widespread power outages also impacted the county, affecting over 10,000 homes in the Port Arthur and Sabine Pass areas. Similar effects were felt in nearby Liberty County where crop damage from the heavy rains and winds amounted to near $10 million

In eastern Brazoria County, Texas, strong winds caused widespread damage to roofs, mobile homes, and automobiles. Damage was also wrought to several aircraft at the Texas Gulf Coast Regional Airport in Freeport, Texas; damage in the city totaled $1 million. Sixty-five percent of structures were damaged in Danbury, Texas. Extensive power outages affected Fort Bend County, Texas. Damage in Matagorda was mostly caused by tidal flooding and winds; 4,500 residents evacuated after the storm surge flooded low-lying areas, forcing the closure of two drawbridges crossing the Intracoastal Waterway connecting the mainland to the Matagorda Peninsula. Wind-induced rice crop damage was estimated at $3.5 million. Elsewhere in East Texas, Alicia's strong winds and heavy rains blocked power and water supplies in several cities. Two people were killed in Montgomery County due to fallen trees.

The hurricane also produced 22 tornadoes across Texas, associated primarily with a single strong outer rainband northeast of Alicia's center; the majority were brief and weak F0 tornadoes that caused negligible damage. One F1 tornado in Harris County damage two businesses near the intersection of Interstate 45 and Texas State Highway NASA Road 1. The strongest tornado was an F2 tornado in Corsicana that was responsible for a significant proportion of the damage toll in North Texas. The tornado touched down in the morning of August 18 in the western extents of Corsicana and lasted for five minutes on a 3 mi (4.8 km) track, damaging several buildings including homes, a church, and a horse arena. In addition to the F2 tornado, the weakening Alicia produced strong winds in North Texas. In Panola County, these winds destroyed outbuildings and downed powerlines and trees in addition to damaging roofs. The weakening storm brought strong thunderstorms over the Dallas–Fort Worth area, bringing gusts estimated between 80–100 mph (130–160 km/h) and causing structural damage throughout the metropolitan area. Some condominiums under construction were destroyed by the winds and trees and powerlines were downed in Keller, Texas and Grapevine, Texas. A freeway sign was dislodged and fell upon two 18-wheeler trucks in Dallas, killing the driver of one truck and seriously injuring the driver of the other truck. Creeks swelled following heavy rains, with a local maximum of 7.48 in (190 mm) near Mexia, Texas. A ten-year-old boy died after he was swept away by a rapidly flowing current.

=== Elsewhere ===
Negligible impacts were felt in Louisiana from Alicia's storm surge. Near El Reno, Oklahoma, 4–7 in (100–180 mm) of rain fell within a 5-hour period, resulting in significant flooding west of the town. Similar rainfall rates flooded several buildings at the University of Oklahoma.

== Aftermath ==
The Red Cross provided food and shelter to 63,000 people in the hurricane's wake, costing about $166 million (1983 USD; $537 million 2026 USD). FEMA gave out $32 million (1983 USD; $103 million 2026 USD) to Alicia's victims and local governments; $23 million (1983 USD; $74.3 million 2026 USD) of that was for picking up debris spread after the storm. More than 16,000 people sought help from FEMA's disaster service centers. The Small Business Administration, aided with 56 volunteers, interviewed over 16,000 victims, and it was predicted that about 7,000 loan applications would be submitted. The Federal Insurance Agency had closed over 1,318 flood insurance cases from Alicia's aftermath, however only 782 received final payment.

On September 23 and September 24, 1983, in the wake of Alicia, two subcommittees of the U.S. House of Representatives held hearings in Houston. The hearing on September 23 were to examine the primary issues of the NWS during Alicia, the effectiveness of the NWS in current procedures, and the use of the NWS. The second hearing, which occurred on September 24, was to discuss the damage and recovery efforts during Alicia. During the September 23 hearing, witnesses agreed that the NWS did well before and during the emergency caused by Alicia. NWS forecasters also testified in which they said they gratified themselves that their predictions were well "on target" and that the local emergency plans had worked so well, which saved many lives. Mayor Gus Manuel on Galveston claimed that the NWS did an excellent job during Alicia. He was also very impressed about their landfall predictions on August 17. During the September 24 hearing, evidence was presented which demonstrated the need for improving readiness to cope with disasters, such as Alicia. Mayor Manuel mentioned that his town needed stronger building codes, which were under review.

=== Retirement ===
Due to the severe damage caused by the hurricane, the name Alicia was retired in the spring of 1984 by the World Meteorological Organization, and will never be used again for another Atlantic tropical system. It was replaced with Allison for the 1989 season.

== See also ==
- List of Texas hurricanes
- List of retired Atlantic hurricane names
- Timeline of the 1983 Atlantic hurricane season
- Hurricane Carla (1961)
- Hurricane Celia (1970)
- Hurricane Ike (2008)
- Hurricane Harvey (2017)
- Hurricane Beryl (2024) - The most recent hurricane to have its eyewall pass through Houston and also caused significant destruction to that area

Preceded by Agnes	Costliest Atlantic hurricanes on Record; 1983	Succeeded by Hugo
