= Charlie Wilson (Texas politician) =

American politician (1933–2010)

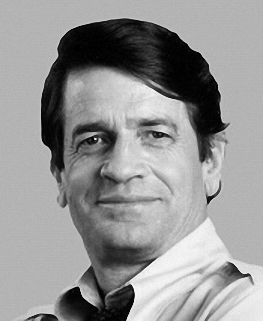
- Wilson c. 1995

Member of the U.S. House of Representatives from Texas's 2nd district
- In office January 3, 1973 – October 8, 1996
- Preceded by: John Dowdy
- Succeeded by: Jim Turner

Member of the Texas Senate from the 3rd district
- In office January 10, 1967 – January 3, 1973
- Preceded by: Martin Dies Jr.
- Succeeded by: Don Adams

Member of the Texas House of Representatives
- In office January 8, 1963 – January 10, 1967
- Preceded by: Steve Burgess
- Succeeded by: David W. Crews
- Constituency: 6th district
- In office January 10, 1961 – January 8, 1963
- Preceded by: William D. Winston
- Succeeded by: David W. Crews
- Constituency: 18th district

Personal details
- Born: Charles Nesbitt Wilson; June 1, 1933 Trinity, Texas, U.S.
- Died: February 10, 2010 (aged 76) Lufkin, Texas, U.S.
- Resting place: Arlington National Cemetery, Arlington County, Virginia, U.S.
- Party: Democratic
- Spouses: Jerry Carter (m. 1973; div. 1983) Barbara Alberstadt (m. 1999)
- Education: United States Naval Academy (BS)
- Occupation: Politician; Naval officer

Military service
- Allegiance: United States
- Branch/service: United States Navy
- Years of service: 1956–1960
- Rank: Lieutenant

Charles Nesbitt Wilson (June 1, 1933 – February 10, 2010) was an American politician and naval officer who was a 12-term Democratic Representative from Texas's 2nd congressional district. Wilson is best known for leading Congress into supporting Operation Cyclone, the largest-ever Central Intelligence Agency (CIA) covert operation, which during the Carter and Reagan administrations supplied military equipment to the Afghan Mujahideen during the Soviet–Afghan War. His behind-the-scenes campaign was the subject of the non-fiction book Charlie Wilson's War: The Extraordinary Story of the Largest Covert Operation in History by George Crile III and the subsequent film Charlie Wilson's War, in which he was portrayed by Tom Hanks.

== Early life and education ==
Wilson was born on June 1, 1933, in the small town of Trinity, Texas, to Charles Edwin Wilson (1905–1981), an accountant for a local timber company, and Wilmuth Wilson (née Nesbitt; 1907–1985), a local florist. Wilson had one sister, Sharon, now known as Sharon Wilson Allison (who would go on to become a local chair of Planned Parenthood and then president of the International Planned Parenthood Federation).

Wilson attended Trinity public schools, and graduated from Trinity High School in 1951. He then attended Sam Houston State University in Huntsville, Texas, prior to being appointed to the United States Naval Academy in Annapolis, Maryland. At the Naval Academy, Wilson earned the second-most demerits in the history of the academy. (His roommate, Robert Mullen, earned the most). Wilson graduated eighth from the bottom of his class in 1956 with a Bachelor of Science degree in engineering, specializing in electronics.

== United States Navy ==
From 1956 to 1960, Wilson served in the United States Navy, where he rose to the rank of Lieutenant and served as a gunnery officer on the USS John W. Weeks (DD-701). He was assigned to the Pentagon as part of an Office of Naval Intelligence unit that evaluated the Soviet Union's nuclear forces.

== Career ==
=== Texas state politics ===
From a young age, Wilson took an interest in national security and foreign matters. Growing up during World War II encouraged Wilson to avidly read military history, including numerous articles and other literature on the war. This led Wilson to have a lifelong admiration for Winston Churchill. Wilson even took the opportunity as a child to "keep watch" over Trinity for Japanese aerial attacks from his post in the back yard. Wilson's early sense of patriotism and his strong interest in international affairs encouraged him to become politically active later in life.

Wilson first ventured into political campaigning as a 13-year-old, with the object of unseating his next-door neighbor, city official Charles Hazard. Wilson's dog had entered Hazard's yard, and Hazard had retaliated by mixing crushed glass into the dog's food, causing fatal internal bleeding. Hearing that Hazard was up for reelection, Wilson obtained a driver's permit and drove 96 voters to the polls in his family's two-door Chevrolet. As voters left the car, Wilson told them, "I don't want to influence your vote, but I'd like you to know that Charles Hazard poisoned my dog." Hazard was defeated by a margin of 16 votes. Wilson delivered the news to Hazard in person, telling him, "You shouldn't poison any more dogs."

In 1960, while working at the Pentagon, Wilson volunteered to help in John F. Kennedy's 1960 presidential campaign against Richard Nixon. While volunteering in Kennedy's campaign, Wilson took a 30-day leave from the U.S. Navy to enter the race for Texas state representative in his home district as a Democrat. But Wilson's action technically violated U.S. Navy regulations, since active-duty service members are prohibited from holding public office. Wilson returned to duty, but his family and friends went door to door campaigning for him. In 1961, at age 27, he was sworn into office in Austin, Texas.

Temple-Inland, Inc., an East Texas forest products producer owned by Arthur Temple and his son Buddy, employed Wilson during his incumbency in the Texas legislature, but business interests were largely suspicious of Wilson's policies. Wilson served as a Texas state legislator for 12 years, including six in the Texas House of Representatives and six in the Texas Senate. In the Texas House and Senate, Wilson supported increased regulations on utilities, Medicaid, tax exemptions for the elderly, the Equal Rights Amendment, and he attempted to raise the state's minimum wage. He was also one of the few Texas legislators who were pro-choice. Wilson's policies earned him the nickname "the liberal from Lufkin".

== U.S. Congress ==
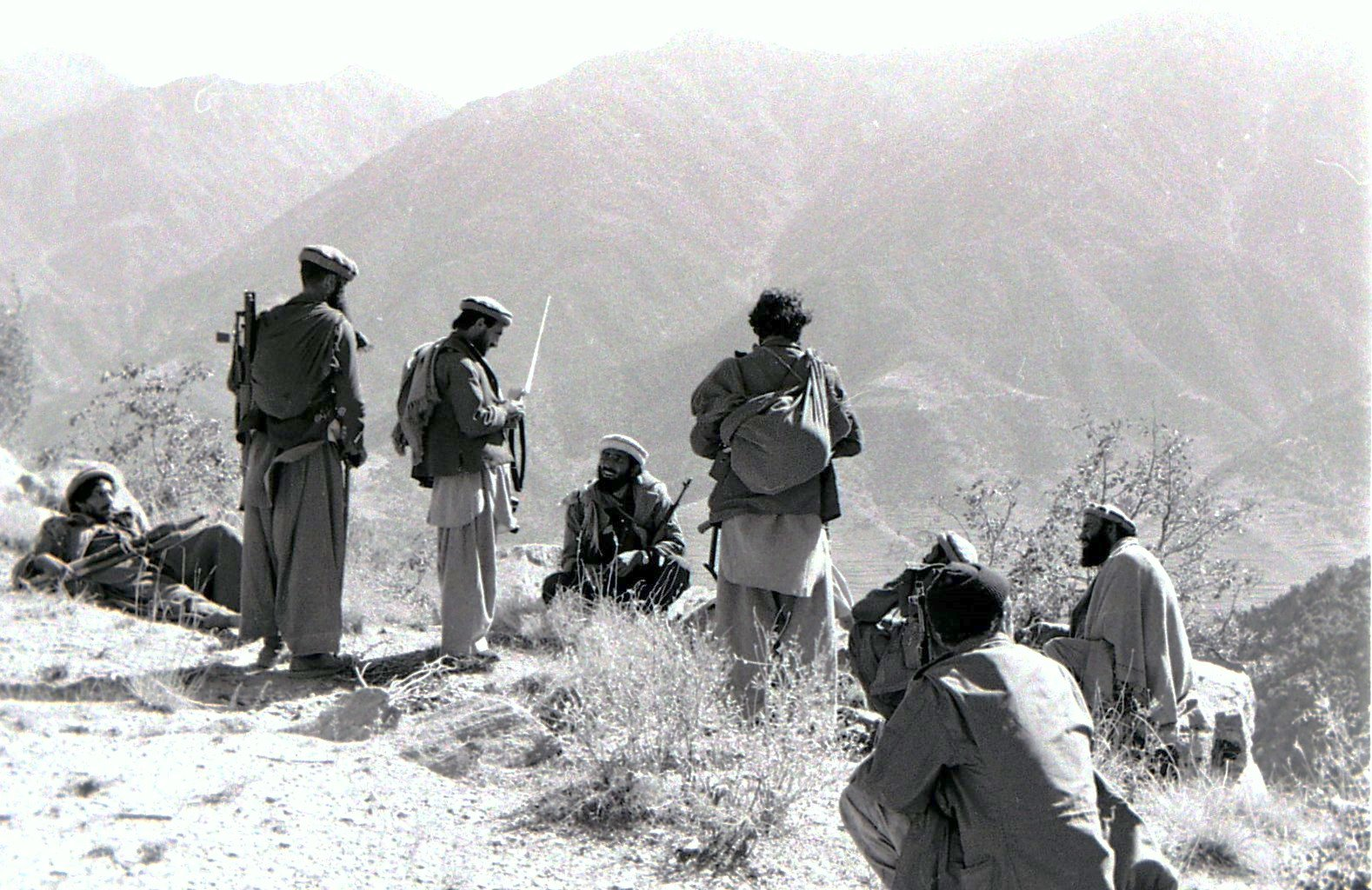
Afghan mujahideen rebels in Afghanistan. During the Soviet-Afghan War, Wilson was a leading proponent of aiding the mujahideen, who sought to drive occupying Soviet forces out of Afghanistan.

In 1972, Wilson was elected to the United States House of Representatives from Texas's 2nd congressional district. He took office in January 1973. Wilson was reelected to Congress 11 times. Wilson was known for his hawkish defense and foreign policy positions and supported the Democratic National Committee's platform on women's rights, social security, and abortion during the 1980s.

As a freshman representative in 1974, Wilson had Big Thicket in Southeast Texas designated as a National Preserve. This early achievement drew him respect from colleagues for his political influence. Wilson quickly earned an appointment to the influential Committee on Appropriations. During his incumbency, Wilson's colleagues regarded him as the "best horse trader in Washington" because of his ability to negotiate and trade votes with other congressmen to ensure passage of his favored bills.

Despite not having many Jewish constituents, Wilson was a proponent of strong relations with Israel throughout his entire congressional career. His support for Israel began during Wilson's first year in Congress when the Yom Kippur War broke out. Wilson quickly came to Israel's defense as a self-proclaimed "Israeli commando." On the appropriations committee, Wilson increased U.S. aid to Israel to $3 billion annually. Wilson's close ties with Israel later enabled him to collaborate with Israeli defense engineers to create and transport man-portable anti-aircraft guns into Pakistan, which were used against the Soviet Union during its occupation of Afghanistan during the Soviet–Afghan War.

On domestic policy, Wilson championed women's and minorities' rights. He continuously voted pro-choice and fought voting discrimination against African Americans. Women and African Americans were two of his largest constituent bases. In 1974, Wilson used the League of Women Voters to pass the Safe Drinking Water Act. In addition to supporting women's rights legislation, Wilson broke Washington tradition and was among the first members of Congress to hire female staff. While Wilson never had a female chief of staff, his office was filled with women, who came to be known as "Charlie's Angels." Wilson's female staff handled constituent issues, ensuring that they never lacked aid and support. Wilson's female staff members drew the attention of his colleagues and media. Although rumors of scandals surrounded Wilson's office, Wilson emphatically insisted that his staff should be respected and their diligent work for the representative enabled them to have freedom to work independently of Wilson.

Wilson lobbied against business interests to maintain a $3.35 per hour minimum wage, sought an increase in Medicare and Medicaid funding for the elderly, underprivileged, and veterans, and gained funding that was used to open the Veterans Affairs Hospital in Lufkin, Texas. Wilson avidly supported the individual right to own firearms, which caused tension between Wilson and his sister Sharon Allison, who opposed such rights. But they reached an agreement that Allison would leave Wilson alone about his views on firearms, and Wilson would continue to support Allison's pro-choice agenda.

Wilson achieved a measure of success through his horse trading capabilities. In 1980, then Speaker of the House Tip O'Neill appointed Wilson to the United States House Committee on Ethics to help protect Representative John Murtha from investigations during the Abscam scandal. In return for Wilson's appointment to this committee, O'Neill awarded him a coveted spot on the Kennedy Center's board of trustees. Wilson also was appointed to the House Defense Appropriations subcommittee, which enabled Wilson to funnel support to then Nicaraguan President Anastasio Somoza Debayle and to Mujahideen rebels in Afghanistan, which sought to oust occupying Soviet forces.

In July 1979, after President Jimmy Carter asked for the resignations of his entire cabinet following his "Malaise" speech, which ultimately led to Carter only accepting five resignations, Wilson was quoted as saying, "Good grief, they're cutting down the biggest trees and keeping the monkeys!"

Wilson thoroughly enjoyed his job and always sought to "take care of the home folks." On October 8, 1996, he announced his resignation from Congress.

=== Soviet–Afghan War ===
In 1980, Wilson read an Associated Press dispatch on the congressional wires describing the refugees fleeing Soviet-occupied Afghanistan. The communist Democratic Republic of Afghanistan had taken over power during the Saur Revolution and asked the Soviet Union to help suppress resistance from the Afghan mujahideen. According to biographer George Crile III, Wilson called the staff of the United States House Committee on Appropriations dealing with "black appropriations" and requested a two-fold appropriation increase for Afghanistan. Because Wilson had just been named to the House Appropriations Subcommittee on Defense (which is responsible for funding CIA operations), his request went through.

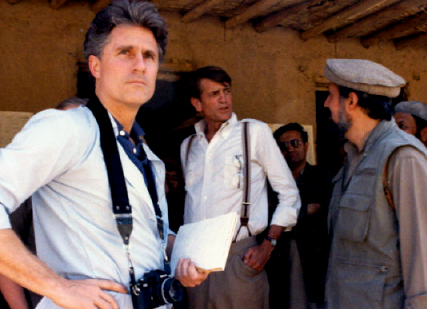
Wilson with George Crile III (left) in Afghanistan

That was not the last time he increased the CIA budget for its Afghan operation. In 1983, he secured an additional $40 million, $17 million of which was allocated for anti-aircraft weapons to shoot down Mil Mi-24 Hind helicopters. The next year, CIA officer Gust Avrakotos directly approached Wilson—breaking the CIA's policy against lobbying Congress for money—asking Wilson for $50 million more. Wilson agreed and convinced Congress, saying, "The U.S. had nothing whatsoever to do with these people's decision to fight ... but we'll be damned by history if we let them fight with stones." Later, Wilson succeeded in giving the Afghans $300 million of unused Pentagon money before the end of the fiscal year. Thus, Wilson directly influenced the level of United States government support for the Afghan mujahideen. Wilson later said that the covert operation succeeded because "there was no partisanship or damaging leaks." Michael Pillsbury, a senior Pentagon official, used Wilson's funding to provide Stinger missiles to the Afghan resistance in a controversial decision to supply the Mujahideen with U.S.-origin state of the art weaponry.

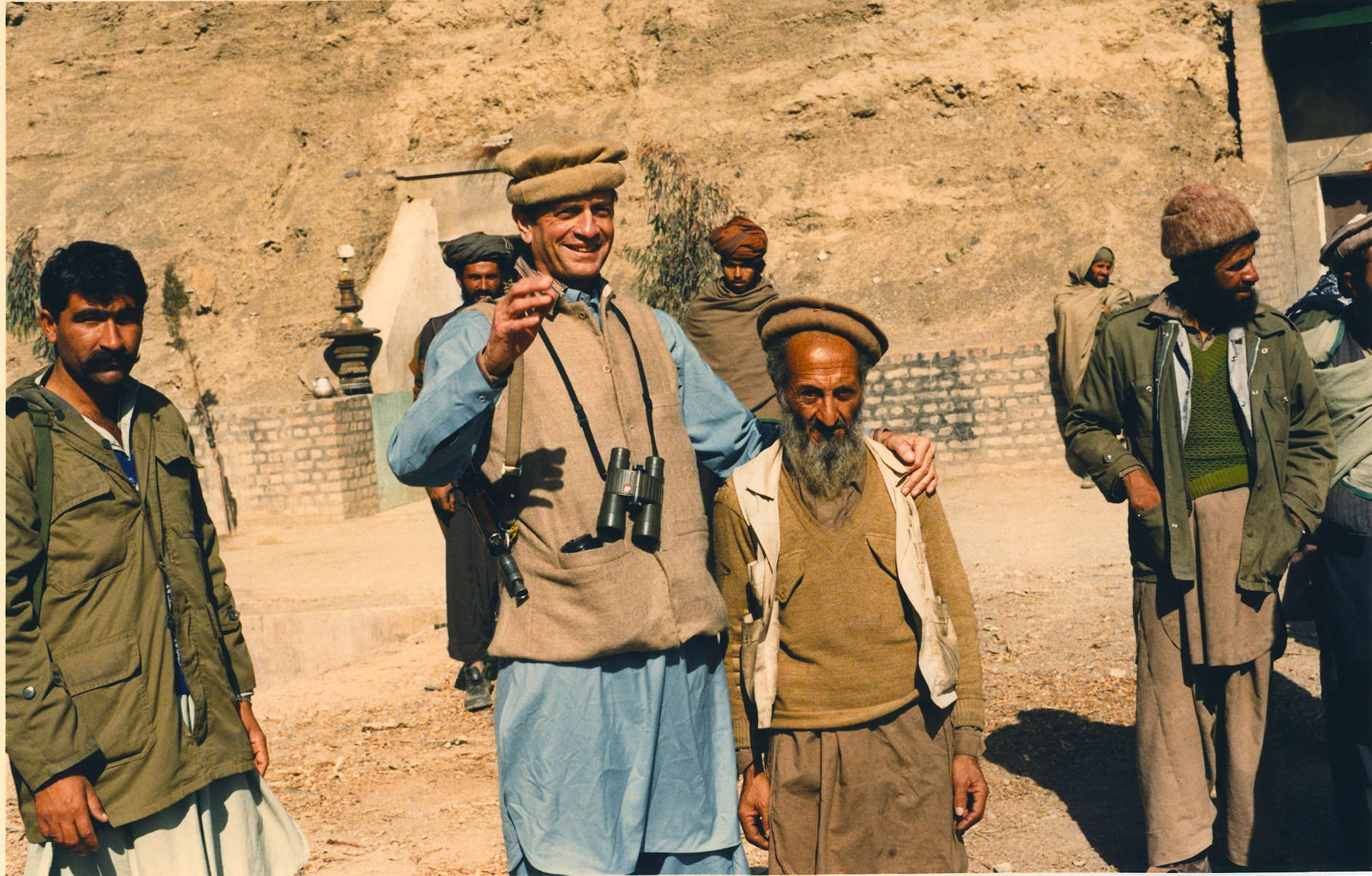
Wilson posing with Mujahideen in Afghanistan

Joanne Herring, along with others, played a role in helping the Afghan resistance fighters get support and military equipment from the United States government. She persuaded Wilson to visit the Pakistani leadership, and after meeting with them he was taken to a major Pakistan-based Afghan refugee camp so he could see for himself the atrocities committed by the Soviets against the Afghan people. About that visit, Wilson later said that "the experience that will always be seared in my memory, was going through those hospitals and seeing, especially those children with their hands blown off from the mines that the Soviets were dropping from their helicopters. That was perhaps the deciding thing ... and it made a huge difference for the next 10 or 12 years of my life because I left those hospitals determined, as long as I had a breath in my body and was a member in Congress, that I was going to do what I could to make the Soviets pay for what they were doing!" In 2008, Wilson said he had "got involved in Afghanistan because I went there and I saw what the Soviets were doing. And I saw the refugee camps."

For his efforts, Wilson was presented with the Honored Colleague Award by the CIA. He became the first civilian to receive the award. However, Wilson's role remains controversial because most of the aid was supplied to Islamist hardliner Gulbuddin Hekmatyar, who has been accused of serious war crimes and later allied with the Taliban after the U.S. invasion.

The decision of the Soviet Union to withdraw from Afghanistan and declare the invasion a mistake led to Wilson commending the Soviet leadership on the floor of the House of Representatives. He also supported United States involvement in the Bosnian War, touring the former Yugoslavia over five days in January 1993; on his return he urged the Clinton administration to lift the arms embargo on Bosnia, remarking "This is good versus evil and, if we do not want to Americanize this, then what do we want to Americanize? We have to stand for something."

During Charlie Wilson's visit to Afghanistan, he met Jalaluddin Haqqani. He wanted to fire a Stinger missile at one of the Soviet helicopters. Haqqani was happy to make Charlie Wilson's wartime wish come true. They dragged chains and tires on the road to create a dust cloud, which would attract Soviet helicopters. However, none of the Soviet helicopters showed up and Charlie Wilson was unable to fire any missiles.

== "Good Time Charlie" ==
Wilson unashamedly lived an extravagant and flamboyant life. Beginning in his naval years, Wilson enjoyed partying and having nights on the town. Wilson was a self-proclaimed "ladies' man" and the news media reported on his exotic bedroom, complete with hot tub and handcuffs where he engaged in romantic affairs. Wilson's "Good Time Charlie" image was first exposed to the public in a 1978 column by Kathleen McLean in The Washington Post.

Over the course of his congressional career, when reporters questioned Wilson about his constituents' view of their representative, Wilson reported that they knew they were not electing a "constipated monk" to office. Wilson unashamedly embraced his playboy persona and never played down his "Good Time" image in public.

Wilson's enjoyment of parties led him to invest with two Texas businessmen to open the Elan–Washington Club. To increase the number of club patrons, Wilson passed out memberships to his congressional colleagues. Halfway through his passing out memberships, Wilson decided that his actions might not be deemed ethical by congress and commented that he "was ethicized right out of business".

Throughout the course of his life, Wilson drank heavily, which may have been a factor in his divorce from Jerry. While in Washington, Wilson had challenges with alcohol use and suffered from severe bouts of depression and insomnia, and his drinking intensified during his involvement in Afghanistan. Wilson's drunkenness also led to a scandal in 1980 when an eyewitness reported that Wilson's Lincoln Continental hit a Mazda in a hit-and-run accident on the Key Bridge in Washington, D.C., the night before his first trip to Pakistan. Although he was never convicted, this accident illustrates Wilson's recklessness with alcohol.

During one of his foreign excursions, Wilson was transported to a hospital in Germany where doctors told Wilson his heart was failing due to his excessive drinking. Wilson sought a second and third opinion at hospitals in Bethesda and Houston and the German doctors' conclusions were confirmed: Wilson had to stop drinking. After these diagnoses, Wilson quit drinking hard liquor but continued to drink wine for several years. Overcoming his struggle with alcoholism, Wilson finally quit drinking after marrying Barbara Alberstadt, a former ballerina, in 1999. His excessive drinking and associated heart problems forced Wilson to have a heart transplant in September 2007.

In addition to alcohol use, Wilson allegedly used illegal drugs. In 1980, Wilson was accused of using cocaine at Caesars Palace in Las Vegas, but an investigation by Justice Department attorney Rudy Giuliani was dropped due to lack of evidence. Liz Wickersham told investigators that she saw Wilson use cocaine only once in the Cayman Islands, but this was outside United States jurisdiction. In "The Charlie Wilson Real Story", Wilson reveals he traveled to Las Vegas in the summer of 1980, and recalls an experience with two strippers in a hot tub.

The girls had cocaine, and the music was loud. It was total happiness. And both of them had ten long, red fingernails with an endless supply of beautiful white powder ... The feds spent a million bucks trying to figure out whether, when those fingernails passed under my nose, did I inhale or exhale, and I ain't telling.

— Charlie Wilson

In 2007, when questioned about his past alleged cocaine use, Wilson reaffirmed: "Nobody knows the answer to that and I ain't telling."

In addition to his "Angels" in the office, Wilson always had a female escort when he was not on the House floor. Wilson's primary motivator to be on the Kennedy Center Board of Trustees was so he always had a place to take a date. Also, following his second trip to Pakistan, Wilson always brought a female companion with him. At one point he even brought Carol Shannon to entertain his hosts with her belly dancing ability. Bringing women to Pakistan created tension between Wilson and the CIA in 1987 when the agency refused to fund his girlfriend's travel expenses. In response, Wilson cut the agency's funding the next year. According to businesswoman and political activist Joanne Herring, Wilson cared about his dates and enjoyed being romantic and caring. Although he was an "unapologetic sexist, chauvinistic redneck", he attracted many women over a number of years.

Wilson has been said to have lived life as "one big party", and lived by the mantra that he could "take his job seriously without taking himself seriously".

== Retirement ==
Wilson declined to run for reelection in 1996 and became a lobbyist for the government of Pakistan before retiring to Lufkin, Texas. He donated his congressional papers to Stephen F. Austin State University. In 1999, he married Barbara Alberstadt, his second wife. Wilson received a heart transplant in 2007, and continued to follow the situation in Afghanistan and Pakistan, where he expressed concerns about events in that region. In July 2009, the University of Texas System Board of Regents established the Charles N. Wilson Chair in Pakistan Studies, which encourages research in the geopolitical importance of Pakistan, and its culture, history, and literature.

== Death ==
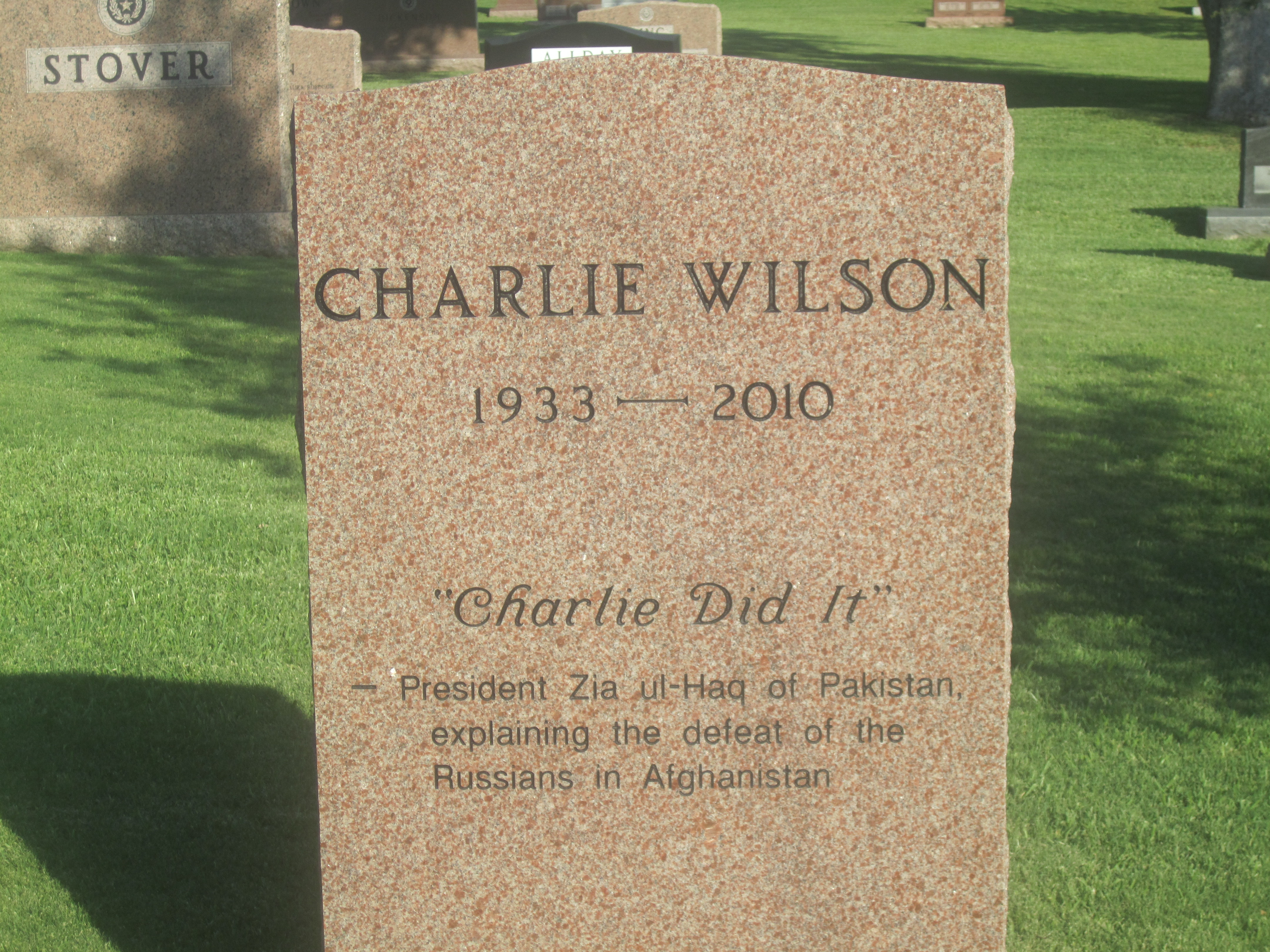
Wilson's cenotaph at Texas State Cemetery in Austin, Texas

On February 10, 2010, Wilson died at age 76 at Memorial Health System of East Texas at Lufkin, now CHI St. Luke's Health Memorial Lufkin, in Lufkin, Texas, after collapsing earlier in the day. He suffered from cardiopulmonary arrest. "America has lost an extraordinary patriot whose life showed that one brave and determined person can alter the course of history," Robert Gates, then U.S. Secretary of Defense said following Wilson's death.

At his funeral, a six-piece jazz band punctuated each eulogy with Charlie's favorites "As Time Goes By", "My Way", and (in honor of his years as a naval intelligence officer) "Anchors Aweigh" and "Navy Hymn".

"He will be missed from the Golan Heights to the Khyber Pass, from the Caspian to the Suez and the halls in Congress, for his civility, and willingness to listen and help and not posture," said John Wing, who worked closely with Wilson on global issues, the two forming a dynamic force in Afghanistan and other regions.

The front rows of the Temple Theater at Angelina College in Lufkin were packed with people, including then Republican U.S. Senator Kay Bailey Hutchison, former U.S. Representative Martin Frost, former Lieutenant Governor Ben Barnes and Houston-based gas titan Oscar Wyatt and his wife Lynn.

After the service, Wilson's widow Barbara welcomed a small group of her late husband's intimates to their home on the golf course in Lufkin. Next to an American eagle sculpture in the living room, the words of Abdur Rahman Khan, emir of Afghanistan from 1880 to 1901, are emblazoned on a brass plaque: "My spirit will remain in Afghanistan even though my soul will go to God. My last words to you my son and successor are: Never Trust the Russians."

On February 23, 2010, Wilson was interred with full military honors at Arlington National Cemetery.

== In popular culture ==
Wilson's successful effort to increase the funding of the anti-Soviet Afghan war was revealed in the book Charlie Wilson's War: The Extraordinary Story of the Largest Covert Operation in History (2003), by George Crile III. In the 2007 film adaptation Charlie Wilson's War, actor Tom Hanks portrayed Wilson. The film portrayed him as a politically incorrect swashbuckler who liked the company of beautiful women.

On December 27, 2007, the History Channel broadcast The True Story of Charlie Wilson, a two-hour documentary about the congressman's Afghan war efforts and his personal life.

== See also ==
- Michael G. Vickers
- Special Activities Division

Texas House of Representatives
Preceded by William D. Winston	Member of the Texas House of Representatives from District 18 (Trinity); 1961–1963	Succeeded by David W. Crews
Preceded by Steve Burgess	Member of the Texas House of Representatives from District 6 (Lufkin); 1963–1967	Succeeded by David W. Crews
Texas Senate
Preceded by Martin Dies, Jr.	Texas State Senator from District 3 (Lufkin); 1967–1973	Succeeded by Don Adams
U.S. House of Representatives
Preceded by John Dowdy	Member of the U.S. House of Representatives from Texas's 2nd congressional district 1973–1997	Succeeded by Jim Turner
