= David William Crews =

American politician (1933–2015)

David Crews

Member of the Texas House of Representatives
- In office January 10, 1967 – January 14, 1969
- Preceded by: Charlie Wilson
- Succeeded by: Price Daniel Jr.
- Constituency: 6th district
- In office January 8, 1963 – January 10, 1967
- Preceded by: Charlie Wilson
- Succeeded by: David Graves Haines
- Constituency: 18th district
- In office January 10, 1961 – January 8, 1963
- Preceded by: Hal Coley
- Succeeded by: Gus Mutscher
- Constituency: 29th district

Personal details
- Born: February 18, 1933 Karnes City, Texas
- Died: February 8, 2015 (aged 81) Conroe, Texas
- Party: Democratic
- Spouse: Becky Chapman (divorced)
- Children: 2
- Education: Baylor University

David William Crews (February 18, 1933 – February 8, 2015) was an American lawyer and politician from Texas.

Born in Karnes City, Texas, Crews received his bachelor's degree from Baylor University and his law degree from Baylor Law School. He practiced law in Conroe, Texas. From 1961 to 1969, Crews was a member of the Texas House of Representatives as a representative of the Democratic party. Crews died in Conroe in 2015.
