= Ernest Bailes =

Texas politician

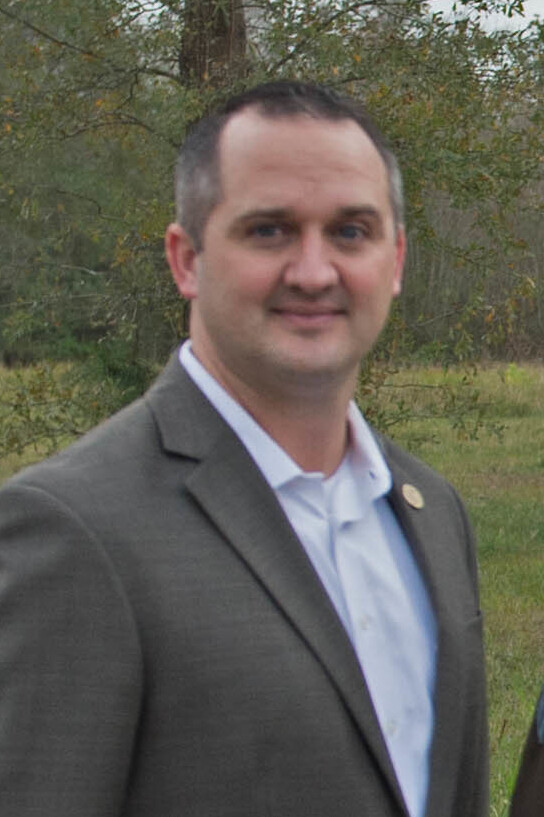

Member of the Texas House of Representatives from the 18th district
- In office January 10, 2017 – January 14, 2025
- Preceded by: John Otto
- Succeeded by: Janis Holt

Personal details
- Born: April 13, 1982 (age 44) San Jacinto County, Texas, U.S.
- Party: Republican
- Spouse: Courtney Bailes
- Children: 2
- Education: Texas A&M University (BS)

Ernest James Bailes IV (born April 13, 1982), is an American politician and businessman who served as a Republican member of the Texas House of Representatives for the 18th district from 2017 to 2025.

== Early life and education ==
Bailes grew up on his family's beef and dairy cattle operations in Shepherd, Texas. He is a graduate of Shepherd High School and earned a Bachelor of Science degree from Texas A&M University in 2004.

== Career ==
Following graduation from A&M, Bailes founded his own company, Repro Select, an "advanced reproductive services provider for cattle and whitetail deer producers across the South-Central United States". Bailes was elected to the Texas House of Representatives in 2016 and assumed office in 2017, succeeding fellow Republican John Otto.

Bailes won re-election to a second term in the general election held on November 6, 2018. With 35,538 votes (75.5 percent), he defeated Democrat Fred Lemond, who polled 11,514 votes (24.5 percent). In 2024, Bailes was defeated in the Republican primary by Janis Holt. During his re-election campaign, Bailes was criticized by Republicans for opposing Governor Greg Abbott's school choice policy and voting to send impeachment articles against Attorney General Ken Paxton to the Texas Senate. Both men along with Senator Ted Cruz endorsed Holt over him.

After Representative Gina Hinojosa was elected governor in the 2026 Texas gubernatorial election, it was announced that Bailes would serve in her bipartisan administration.

== Legislative history ==
Bailes served on the House Committee for Culture, Recreation, and Tourism, as well as the House Committee on Energy Resources. Bailes voted to prohibit one-punch straight-ticket voting, and voted to establish standards for determining adjusted franchise tax rates. Bailes voted against the Schaefer Amendment of Senate Bill 8, which would have required women to carry fetuses with fatal fetal abnormalities to term. The amendment was tabled. SB8 related to certain prohibited abortions and the treatment and disposition of embryonic and fetal tissue remains, creating a civil cause of action and imposing a civil penalty, creating criminal offense. The law was struck down by a court challenge before taking effect.

== Personal life ==
Bailes is married to Courtney Bailes, a third-grade teacher in the Coldspring–Oakhurst CISD. The couple has two sons named Cinco and Rigby.

Texas House of Representatives
Preceded by John Otto	Member of the Texas House of Representatives from the 18th district 2017–2025	Succeeded by Janis Holt
