= John Otto (politician) =

Texas legislator

John Clifford Otto

Member of the Texas House of Representatives from the 18th district
- In office January 11, 2005 – January 10, 2017
- Preceded by: Daniel Parker "Dan" Ellis
- Succeeded by: Ernest Bailes

Personal details
- Born: October 14, 1948 Dayton, Texas, U.S.
- Died: August 1, 2020 (aged 71) Houston, Texas, U.S.
- Party: Republican
- Spouse: Nancy Whitman (m. 1969)
- Education: Dayton High School; Texas A&M University
- Profession: Accountant

Military service
- Allegiance: United States
- Branch/service: U.S. Army
- Rank: Second lieutenant

John Clifford Otto (1948–2020) was an American politician and CPA who served as a member of the Texas House of Representatives from 2005 to 2017 representing District 18, which contained Liberty, San Jacinto, and Walker counties. Otto did not seek reelection in 2016 and retired in early 2017. Otto died in 2020 at the age of 71 due to pancreatic cancer complications.
