= Janis Holt =

American politician

Member of the Texas House of Representatives from the 18th district
- Incumbent
- Assumed office January 14, 2025
- Preceded by: Ernest Bailes

Personal details
- Born: December 20, 1959 (age 66) Groves, Texas, U.S.
- Party: Republican
- Spouse: Alton
- Education: Lamar University
- Website: Campaign website

Janis Holt (born December 20, 1959) is an American politician. She represents the 18th district of the Texas House of Representatives.

In March 2024, Holt defeated incumbent Ernest Bailes in the Republican primary election for the 18th district of the Texas House of Representatives. In November 2024, Holt defeated Seth Steele, winning 86.6% of the vote. She succeeded Ernest Bailes. She assumed office on January 14, 2025.

== Texas House of Representatives ==
In 2025, Holt sponsored a bill to ban gender affirming care for transgender individuals of all ages.

Texas House of Representatives
Preceded by Ernest Bailes	Member of the Texas House of Representatives from the 18th district 2025–present	Incumbent
