= William D. Winston (Texas politician) =

American politician

Member of the Texas House of Representatives from the 18th district
- In office January 13, 1959 – January 10, 1961
- Preceded by: Douglas Bryan Byrd
- Succeeded by: Charlie Wilson

Personal details
- Born: William Darracott Winston II; July 25, 1932 Crosby, Texas, U.S.
- Died: January 29, 2007 (aged 74) Lufkin, Texas, U.S.
- Resting place: Garden of Memories Memorial Park, Lufkin, Texas, U.S.
- Party: Democratic
- Education: University of Texas; University of Texas School of Law
- Profession: Attorney

Military service
- Allegiance: United States
- Branch/service: U.S. Army
- Rank: Specialist III

William Darracott Winston II (July 25, 1932 – January 29, 2007) was an American politician. He served as a member of the Texas House of Representatives of the Democratic party for Angelina and Trinity counties from the 18th district. He worked as an attorney in Lufkin, Texas, which was his home city when he was in office.

He attended the University of Texas and the University of Texas School of Law. He attained the rank of specialist III in the United States Army.

Winston died on January 29, 2007, at the age of 74.
