= William D. Winston (Virginia politician) =

American politician

Member of the Virginia Senate
- In office 1852–1855
- Constituency: Hanover County

Member of the Virginia House of Delegates
- In office 1843–1845
- Constituency: Hanover County

William D. Winston was an American politician. He served in both chambers of the Virginia General Assembly, representing Hanover County in the Virginia House of Delegates (1843–1845) and the Virginia Senate (1852–1855).
