= List of Texas hurricanes =

The U.S. state of Texas has had many hurricanes affect it. It is the U.S. state with the second-most hurricanes affecting it, only behind Florida. Storms affecting it go back to 1527.

== See also ==
- List of United States hurricanes
