= Southeast Texas =

Region of Texas

- Region
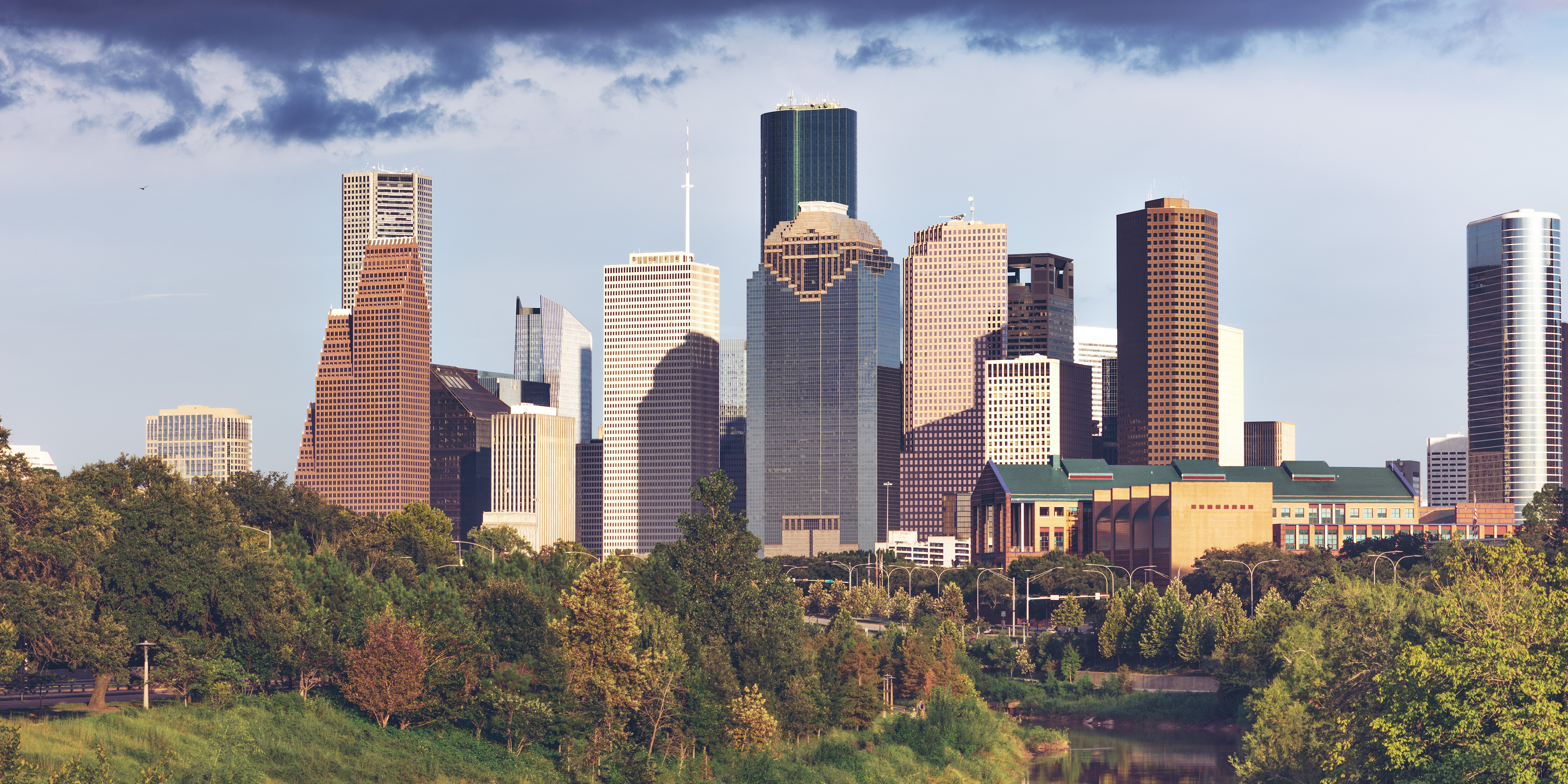
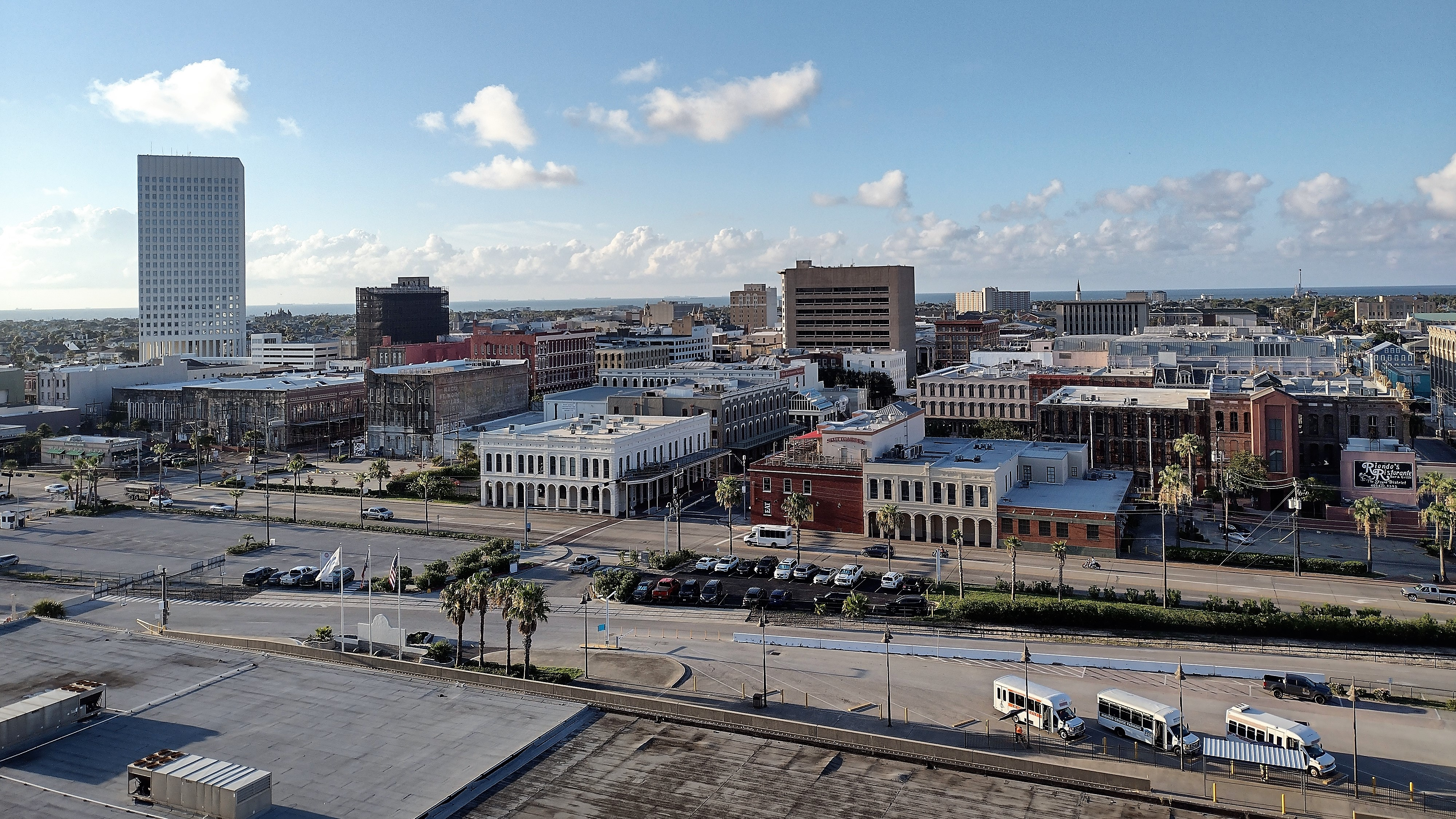
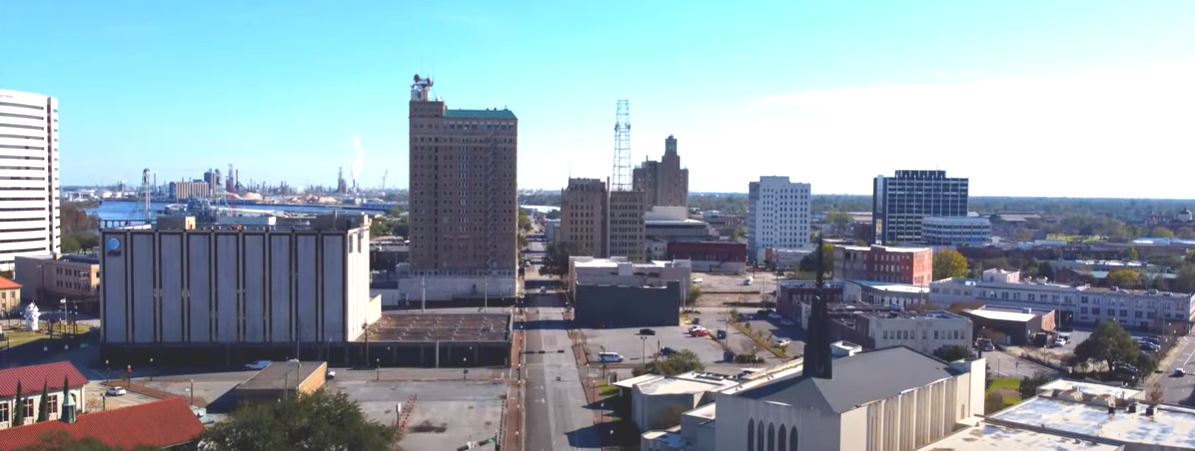
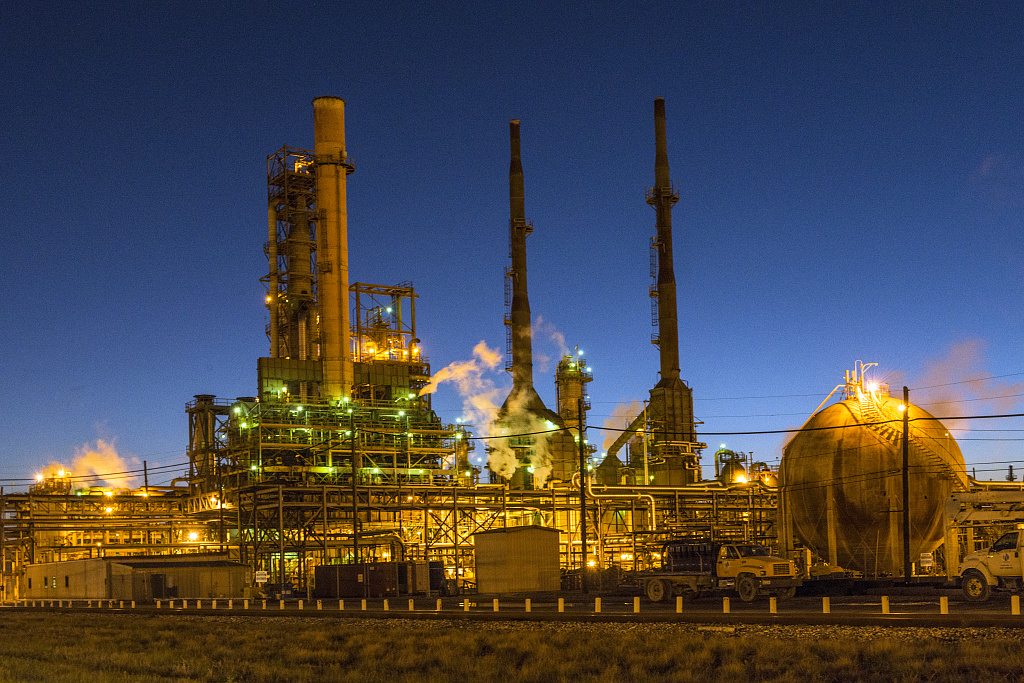
- From top, left to right: Downtown Houston, Downtown Galveston, Downtown Beaumont, and Port Arthur

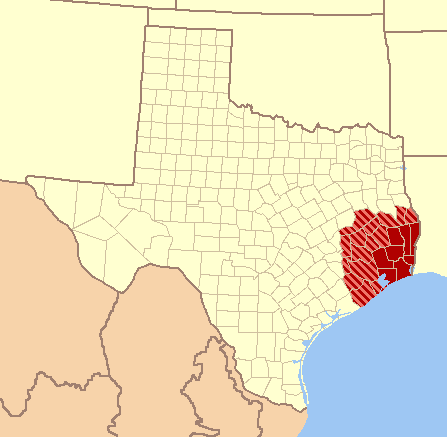
- Southeast Texas counties in red
- Country: United States
- State: Texas
- Largest city: Houston

Population (2020)
  - Total: 7,662,325

Southeast Texas is a cultural and geographic region in the U.S. state of Texas, bordering Southwest Louisiana and its greater Acadiana region to the east. Being a part of East Texas, the region is geographically centered on the Greater Houston and Beaumont–Port Arthur metropolitan statistical areas with a combined population of 7,662,325 according to the 2020 U.S. census.

== Geography ==
Southeast Texas includes part of the coast of the Gulf of Mexico and most of the Texas portion of the Intracoastal Waterway. The area is also crossed by numerous rivers and streams, the largest three being the Sabine River, the Neches River, and the Trinity River.

In Southeast Texas and the rest of the Southern United States, small rivers and creeks collect into swamps called "bayous" and merge with the surrounding forest. The only large bodies of water in Southeast Texas are Galveston Bay and Sabine Lake, but the large reservoirs of the remainder of East Texas are just to the north. The eastern portion of Southeast Texas is geographically and culturally attached to Southwest Louisiana, though western, southern and northern areas maintain their own distinct Texan cultural identities.

Near the coast, the land is low and extremely flat, and often marshy. The Piney Woods extend into the northern parts of Southeast Texas, reaching as far south as the rice paddies and marshlands that lie between Houston and Beaumont. The highest point on the coast is at High Island, where a salt dome raises the elevation to around 40 feet (12 m) above sea level.

Away from the coast, the terrain begins to exhibit the rolling hills of Northeast and Central Texas. Toward Central Texas, the mixed pine and hardwood forests give way to the East Central Texas forests of post oak and grasslands.

=== Golden Triangle ===
The Golden Triangle is an area of extreme Southeast Texas near the Louisiana border. The "triangle" is formed by Beaumont, Port Arthur, and Orange, which are the largest cities in the area. "Golden" refers to the wealth that came from the Spindletop oil strike near Beaumont in 1901. In an attempt to distance the area from the petrochemical industry, some area interests attempted to rename the Golden Triangle as the "Triplex." This name change did not catch on, and local residents still refer to it as the Golden Triangle. Some residents of the Golden Triangle do not consider the Greater Houston area to be part of Southeast Texas and place the western boundary of the region approximately at the Trinity River, which is roughly 30 miles from downtown Houston.

This area holds the annual South Texas State Fair in Beaumont.

=== Big Thicket ===
The Big Thicket is an area of dense forest located in the area just north and northwest of the city of Beaumont. There are many small towns in this area, including Woodville and Kountze.

The Big Thicket National Preserve protects part of the old thicket, highlighting the area's biological resources. The 97,000 acre (390 km^{2}) preserve boasts a varied ecology of piney woods, swamps, and coastal prairies. It includes extremely diverse range of plant species including orchids, cactus, cypress, and pine in close proximity to each other. Approximately 65,000 people visit this area each year.

Two historically important routes cross the Big Thicket: to the north lies the old cattle route or Beef Trail, that ran from Tyler County to Louisiana; to the south is the Spanish Trail or the Atascosito Road, that parallels modern Highway 90 and Interstate 10 from Liberty to Orange.

=== Galveston Bay ===
Galveston Bay is a large estuary located along Texas upper coast. The bay is fed by the Trinity River and the San Jacinto River, numerous local bayous, and incoming tides from the Gulf of Mexico. The bay covers approximately 600 square miles (1,500 km^{2}), and is 30 miles (50 km) long and 17 miles (27 km) wide. Galveston Bay is on average 7–9 feet (2-3 m) deep. The bay has three inlets to the Gulf of Mexico: Bolivar Roads (the exit of the Houston Ship Channel) between Galveston Island and the Bolivar Peninsula, San Luis Pass to the west, and Rollover Pass to the east.

The Houston Ship Channel, connecting the Port of Houston to the Gulf, passes through Galveston Bay. Houston is the largest city on the bay, while smaller ones include Galveston, Pasadena, Baytown, and Texas City. The bay provides nursery and spawning grounds for large amounts of marine life and is important for both commercial and recreational fishing.

=== Climate ===
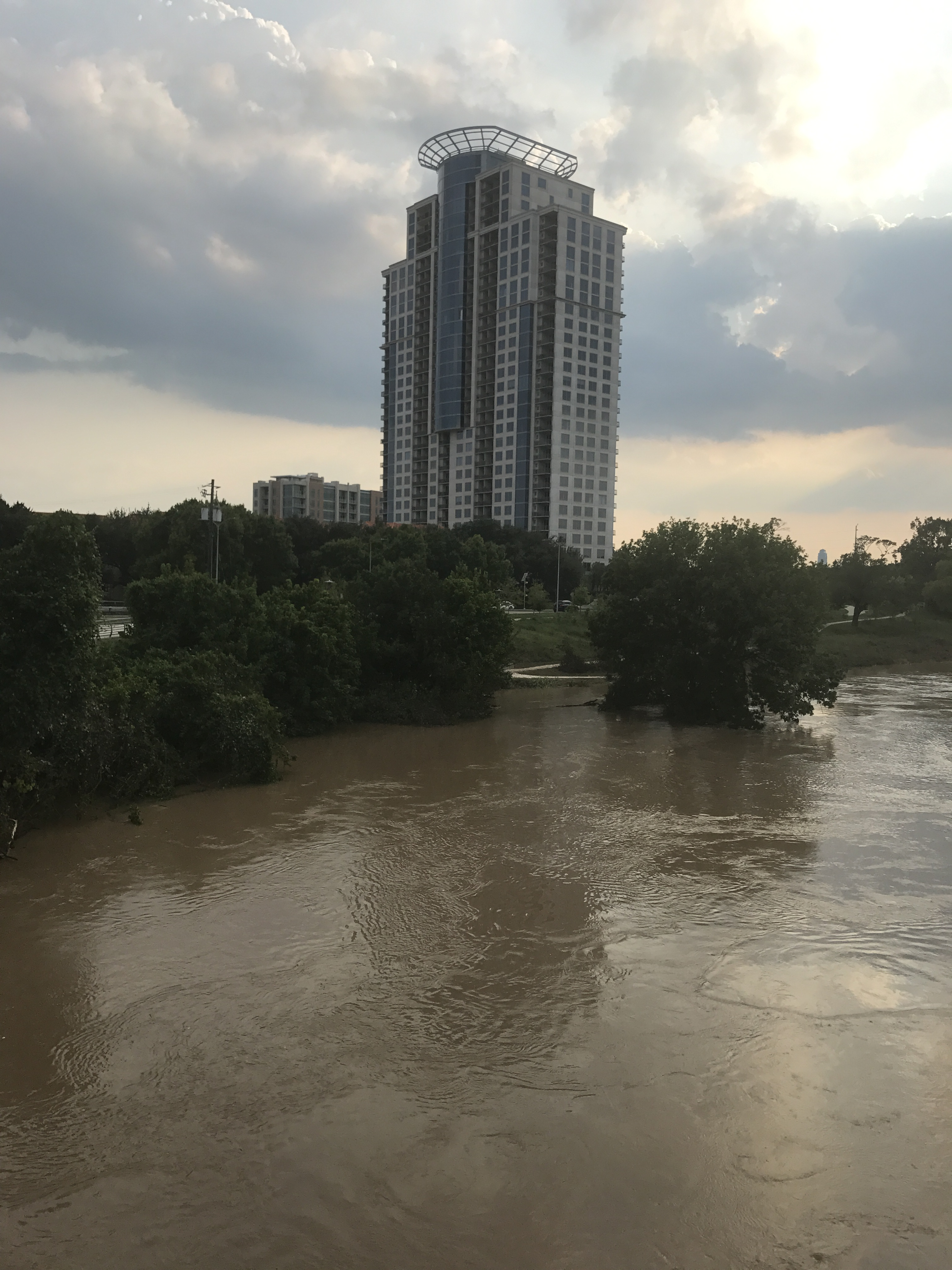
Floods caused by Hurricane Harvey, Houston, 2017

Compared to the rest of the state, Southeast Texas' climate is warmer in winter and cooler in summer. On average, the region receives more rain than other parts of the state, and it experiences a wet season and dry season like the tropics. This can increase the humidity level in the region. The relatively mild and wet climate is largely due to the influence of the Gulf of Mexico.

The Southeast Texas region can be comparable to that of Southern Louisiana in climate. Average annual rainfall in the Golden Triangle is 60 inches (1,500 mm). Rainfall totals in other parts of Southeast Texas are lower, but still in excess of 40 inches (1,000 mm) per year. During Tropical Storm Claudette in 1979, the city of Alvin recorded an official 24-hour rainfall total of 42 inches (1,067 mm)—the highest one-day rainfall total ever measured in the United States. Nederland received 66 inches during Harvey.

Houston has been called the "Lightning Capital of Texas", as its density of lightning strikes is higher than it is in other parts of the state. This area of unusually high lightning activity stretches from Houston eastward into Southwest Louisiana. Much of this can be explained by the natural occurrence of thunderstorms in the region, which form almost daily during the wet season. However, the unusual clustering of lightning around the developed areas of Houston, the Golden Triangle, and Lake Charles, Louisiana have led many researchers to believe that some combination of urban heat islands and air pollution are responsible for increasing the number of lightning strikes beyond even the already-high natural levels.

Southeast Texas is vulnerable to hurricanes. Major hurricanes that have severely affected the area in the 21st century include Hurricane Rita in 2005; Hurricane Ike, which passed over much of Houston and surrounding areas in 2008; and Hurricane Harvey, which inundated Southeast Texas in 2017. Weaker storms strike the area routinely. Some, like Tropical Storm Allison and Tropical Storm Claudette, have caused considerable damage.

Climate data for Houston (Intercontinental Airport), 1991–2020 normals, (Note: Mean monthly maxima and minima (i.e. the highest and lowest temperature readings during an entire month or year) calculated based on data at said location from 1991 to 2020.) extremes 1888–present (Note: Official records for Houston were kept at the Weather Bureau in downtown from July 1888 to May 1969, and at Intercontinental since June 1969.)
Month	Jan	Feb	Mar	Apr	May	Jun	Jul	Aug	Sep	Oct	Nov	Dec	Year
Record high °F (°C)	85 (29)	91 (33)	96 (36)	95 (35)	99 (37)	107 (42)	105 (41)	109 (43)	109 (43)	99 (37)	89 (32)	85 (29)	109 (43)
Mean maximum °F (°C)	78.9 (26.1)	81.2 (27.3)	85.4 (29.7)	88.6 (31.4)	93.8 (34.3)	97.8 (36.6)	99.1 (37.3)	101.2 (38.4)	97.3 (36.3)	92.2 (33.4)	84.9 (29.4)	80.7 (27.1)	102.1 (38.9)
Mean daily maximum °F (°C)	63.8 (17.7)	67.8 (19.9)	74.0 (23.3)	80.1 (26.7)	86.9 (30.5)	92.3 (33.5)	94.5 (34.7)	94.9 (34.9)	90.4 (32.4)	82.8 (28.2)	72.6 (22.6)	65.3 (18.5)	80.5 (26.9)
Daily mean °F (°C)	53.8 (12.1)	57.7 (14.3)	63.8 (17.7)	70.0 (21.1)	77.4 (25.2)	83.0 (28.3)	85.1 (29.5)	85.2 (29.6)	80.5 (26.9)	71.8 (22.1)	62.0 (16.7)	55.4 (13.0)	70.5 (21.4)
Mean daily minimum °F (°C)	43.7 (6.5)	47.6 (8.7)	53.6 (12.0)	59.8 (15.4)	67.8 (19.9)	73.7 (23.2)	75.7 (24.3)	75.4 (24.1)	70.6 (21.4)	60.9 (16.1)	51.5 (10.8)	45.6 (7.6)	60.5 (15.8)
Mean minimum °F (°C)	27.5 (−2.5)	31.6 (−0.2)	35.0 (1.7)	43.4 (6.3)	53.8 (12.1)	66.5 (19.2)	70.5 (21.4)	70.0 (21.1)	58.3 (14.6)	44.1 (6.7)	34.2 (1.2)	30.0 (−1.1)	26.0 (−3.3)
Record low °F (°C)	5 (−15)	6 (−14)	21 (−6)	31 (−1)	42 (6)	52 (11)	62 (17)	54 (12)	45 (7)	29 (−2)	19 (−7)	7 (−14)	5 (−15)
Average precipitation inches (mm)	3.76 (96)	2.97 (75)	3.47 (88)	3.95 (100)	5.01 (127)	6.00 (152)	3.77 (96)	4.84 (123)	4.71 (120)	5.46 (139)	3.87 (98)	4.03 (102)	51.84 (1,317)
Average snowfall inches (cm)	0.0 (0.0)	0.0 (0.0)	0.0 (0.0)	0.0 (0.0)	0.0 (0.0)	0.0 (0.0)	0.0 (0.0)	0.0 (0.0)	0.0 (0.0)	0.0 (0.0)	0.0 (0.0)	0.1 (0.25)	0.1 (0.25)
Average precipitation days (≥ 0.01 in)	10.0	8.8	8.8	7.3	8.6	10.0	9.1	8.5	8.4	7.7	7.6	9.6	104.4
Average snowy days (≥ 0.1 in)	0.0	0.0	0.0	0.0	0.0	0.0	0.0	0.0	0.0	0.0	0.0	0.1	0.1
Average relative humidity (%)	74.7	73.4	72.7	73.1	75.0	74.6	74.4	75.1	76.8	75.4	76.0	75.5	74.7
Average dew point °F (°C)	41.5 (5.3)	44.2 (6.8)	51.3 (10.7)	57.7 (14.3)	65.1 (18.4)	70.3 (21.3)	72.1 (22.3)	72.0 (22.2)	68.5 (20.3)	59.5 (15.3)	51.4 (10.8)	44.8 (7.1)	58.2 (14.6)
Mean monthly sunshine hours	143.4	155.0	192.5	209.8	249.2	281.3	293.9	270.5	236.5	228.8	168.3	148.7	2,577.9
Percentage possible sunshine	44	50	52	54	59	67	68	66	64	64	53	47	58
Average ultraviolet index	3.5	5.0	7.1	8.6	9.6	10.3	9.9	9.5	8.1	5.9	4.0	3.2	7.0
Source 1: NOAA (relative humidity and dew point 1969–1990, sun 1961–1990)
Source 2: UV Index Today (1995 to 2022)

Climate data for Beaumont, Texas (1991–2020 normals, extremes 1901–present)
Month	Jan	Feb	Mar	Apr	May	Jun	Jul	Aug	Sep	Oct	Nov	Dec	Year
Record high °F (°C)	86 (30)	90 (32)	95 (35)	97 (36)	101 (38)	106 (41)	108 (42)	105 (41)	108 (42)	99 (37)	94 (34)	86 (30)	108 (42)
Mean daily maximum °F (°C)	62.6 (17.0)	65.8 (18.8)	72.1 (22.3)	78.3 (25.7)	85.2 (29.6)	90.4 (32.4)	92.0 (33.3)	92.8 (33.8)	88.6 (31.4)	81.5 (27.5)	71.4 (21.9)	64.2 (17.9)	78.7 (25.9)
Daily mean °F (°C)	52.9 (11.6)	56.6 (13.7)	62.9 (17.2)	68.9 (20.5)	76.6 (24.8)	82.3 (27.9)	83.7 (28.7)	84.1 (28.9)	79.3 (26.3)	71.0 (21.7)	61.3 (16.3)	54.7 (12.6)	69.5 (20.8)
Mean daily minimum °F (°C)	43.3 (6.3)	47.4 (8.6)	53.7 (12.1)	59.4 (15.2)	68.1 (20.1)	74.1 (23.4)	75.5 (24.2)	75.3 (24.1)	70.1 (21.2)	60.6 (15.9)	51.2 (10.7)	45.1 (7.3)	60.3 (15.7)
Record low °F (°C)	11 (−12)	10 (−12)	20 (−7)	36 (2)	43 (6)	53 (12)	64 (18)	57 (14)	44 (7)	33 (1)	23 (−5)	20 (−7)	10 (−12)
Average precipitation inches (mm)	5.38 (137)	3.66 (93)	3.73 (95)	3.93 (100)	5.24 (133)	7.04 (179)	6.48 (165)	7.19 (183)	7.36 (187)	5.38 (137)	4.42 (112)	5.26 (134)	65.07 (1,653)
Average snowfall inches (cm)	0.0 (0.0)	0.0 (0.0)	0.0 (0.0)	0.0 (0.0)	0.0 (0.0)	0.0 (0.0)	0.0 (0.0)	0.0 (0.0)	0.0 (0.0)	0.0 (0.0)	0.0 (0.0)	0.1 (0.25)	0.1 (0.25)
Average precipitation days (≥ 0.01 in)	10.3	9.5	8.2	7.2	7.2	10.6	12.0	10.4	9.2	7.2	7.9	10.0	109.7
Source 1: NOAA "NowData - NOAA Online Weather Data". National Oceanic and Atmospheric Administration.
Source 2: NOAA: Snow Climatology for Southeast Texas & Southwest Louisiana

== Culture ==
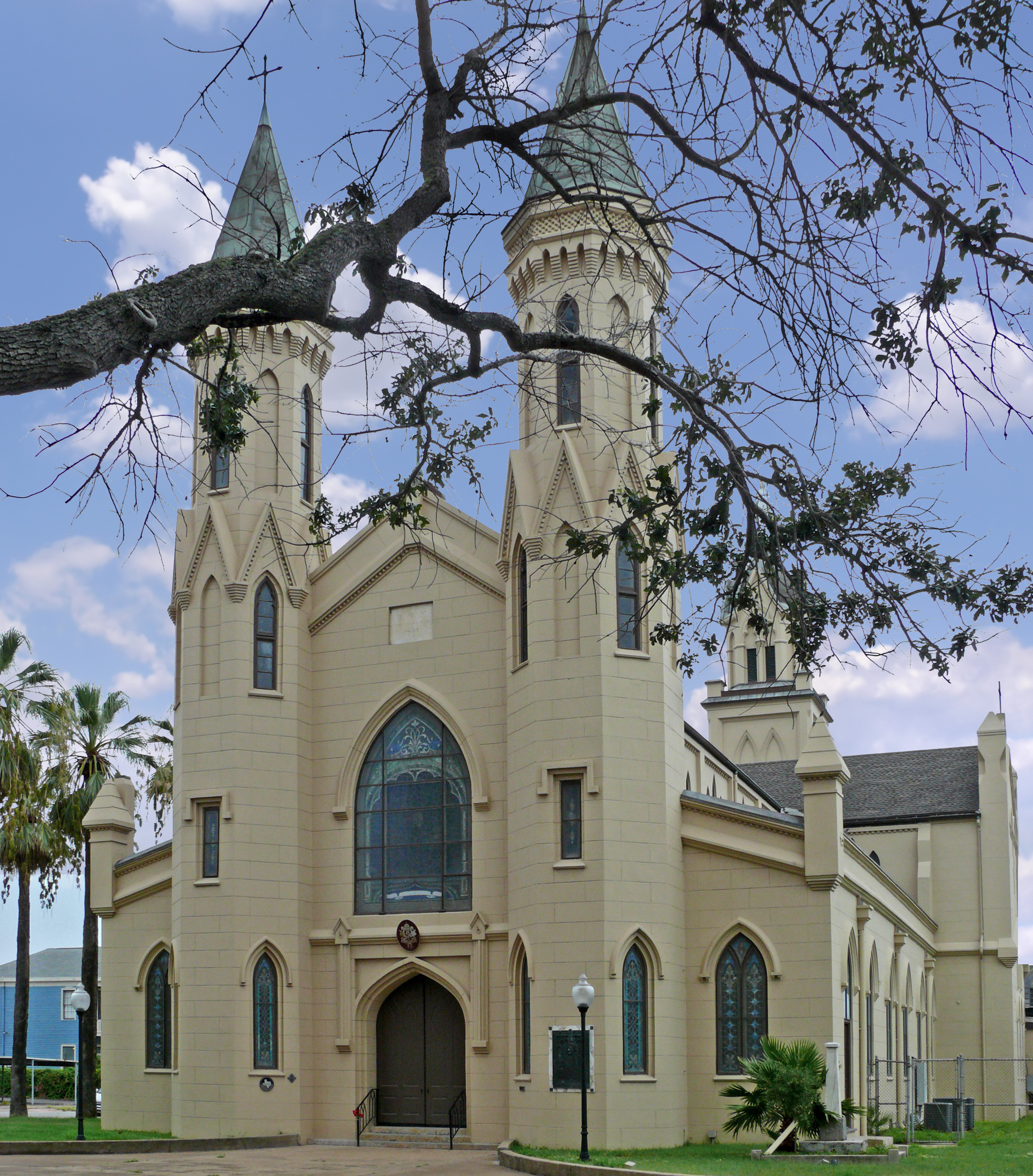
St. Mary's Cathedral Basilica, Galveston

The culture of Southeast Texas is closer to Acadiana in Louisiana or the Gulf Coast of Mississippi, than it is to West Texas; among some of its population, Cajun and Creole identity has been preserved and can be seen during cultural celebrations such as Mardi Gras. Much of contemporary Southeast Texas has its roots in traditions that go back generations; the region is consistent with much of northern and eastern Texas in that it is part of the Bible Belt—an area in which many inhabitants have strongly traditional Protestant Christian beliefs. Additionally, the Catholic Church in the United States has remained a prominent religious influence since Spanish colonization and missionary work. Among its largest cities in East Texas outside Houston, many still follow a rural Southern way of life, especially in dialect, mannerisms, and cuisine.

== Economy ==
In the urban areas of Southeast Texas, energy, healthcare, manufacturing and technology are prominent industries. Houston is the largest city and economic center of Southeast Texas, and it holds the third most Fortune 500 headquarters by concentration in the U.S. as of 2021. Major corporations in the region include APA Corporation, Chevron Corporation, HostGator, Jason's Deli, JPMorgan Chase, and Sysco. Outside of the cities, agriculture, tourism and small business have always been major factors in the economy.

== Higher education ==
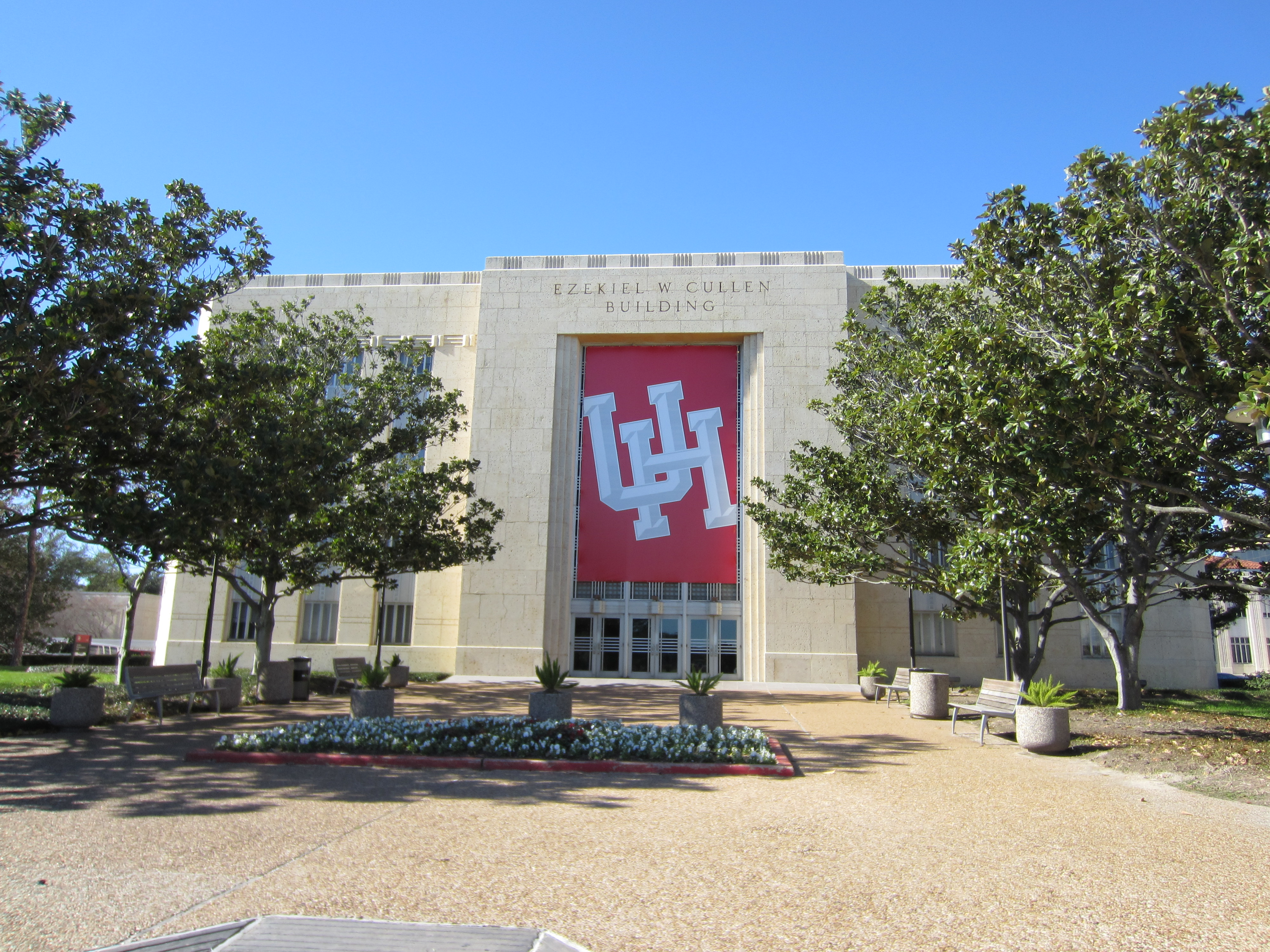
University of Houston

The University of Houston System is the largest and most prominent university system based in Southeast Texas, although Texas Southern University, Prairie View A&M University, the University of Saint Thomas, Houston Christian University, and others are also notable subjects to the region's undergraduate and postgraduate systems. Rice University in Houston was ranked 15th in the nation by U.S. News & World Report as of 2022. In areas closer to Beaumont, Lamar University within the Texas State University System is the center of higher education.

== Sports ==
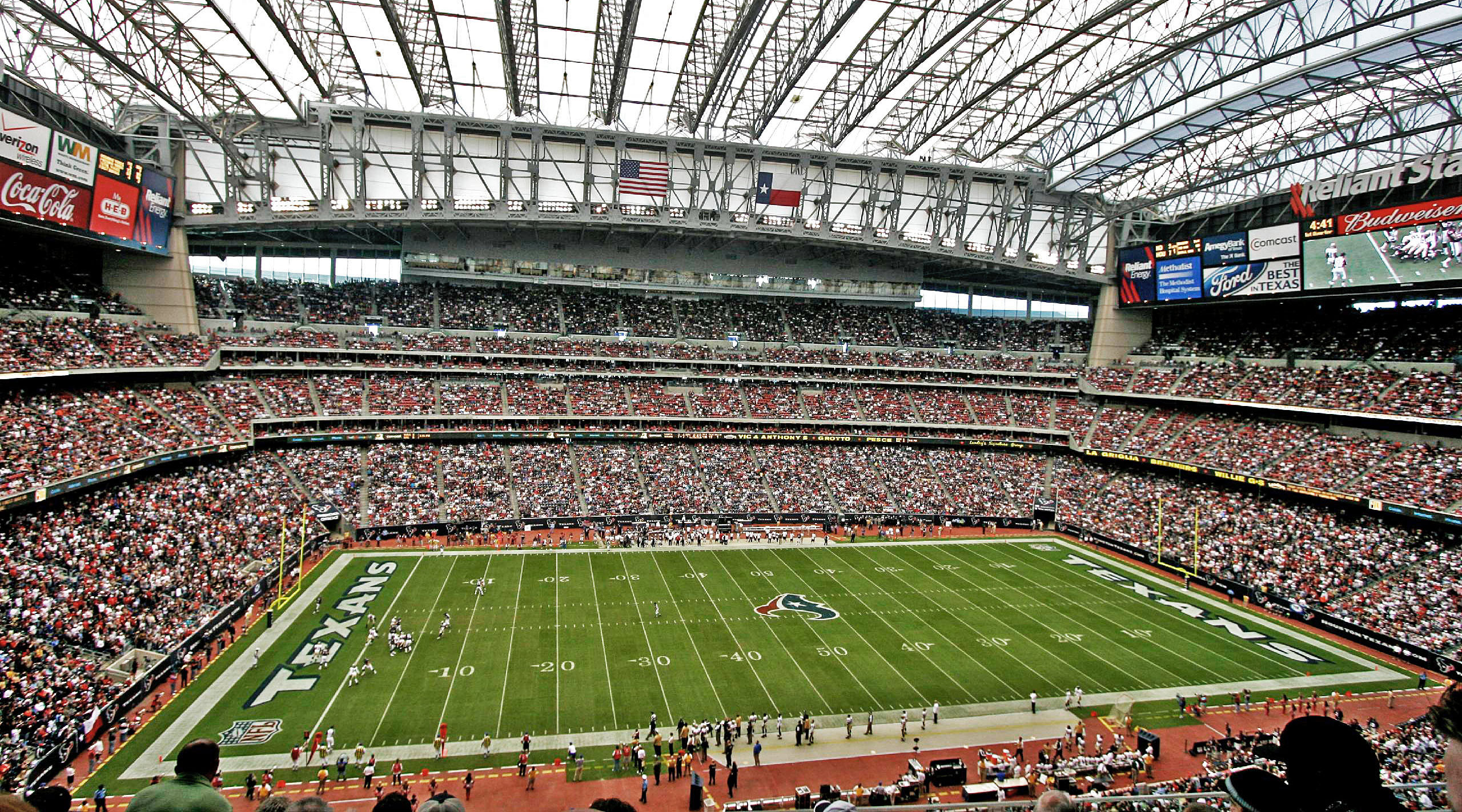
NRG Stadium of the Houston Texans

Within Southeast Texas, the city of Houston and its metropolitan area has a rich sporting culture and area residents are active in many spectator and participant sports. Spectators attend events including teams from four major professional sports teams and collegiate sports; Beaumont is also the second principal location for collegiate sports. Participants enjoy activities from running in Memorial Park to sailing on Galveston Bay and Clear Lake. A number of other sports are also available, including nearly a dozen fencing clubs, ranging from recreational clubs to elite competitive organizations.

=== Major league ===
Professional major league teams
Club	League	Sport	Venue	Founded	Titles	Attendance
Houston Texans	NFL	Football	NRG Stadium	2002	0	71,644
Houston Astros	MLB	Baseball	Daikin Park	1962	2 (2017, 2022)	31,628
Houston Dynamo FC	MLS	Soccer	Shell Energy Stadium	2006	2 (2006, 2007)	20,117
Houston Rockets	NBA	Basketball	Toyota Center	1967	2 (1994, 1995)	16,672

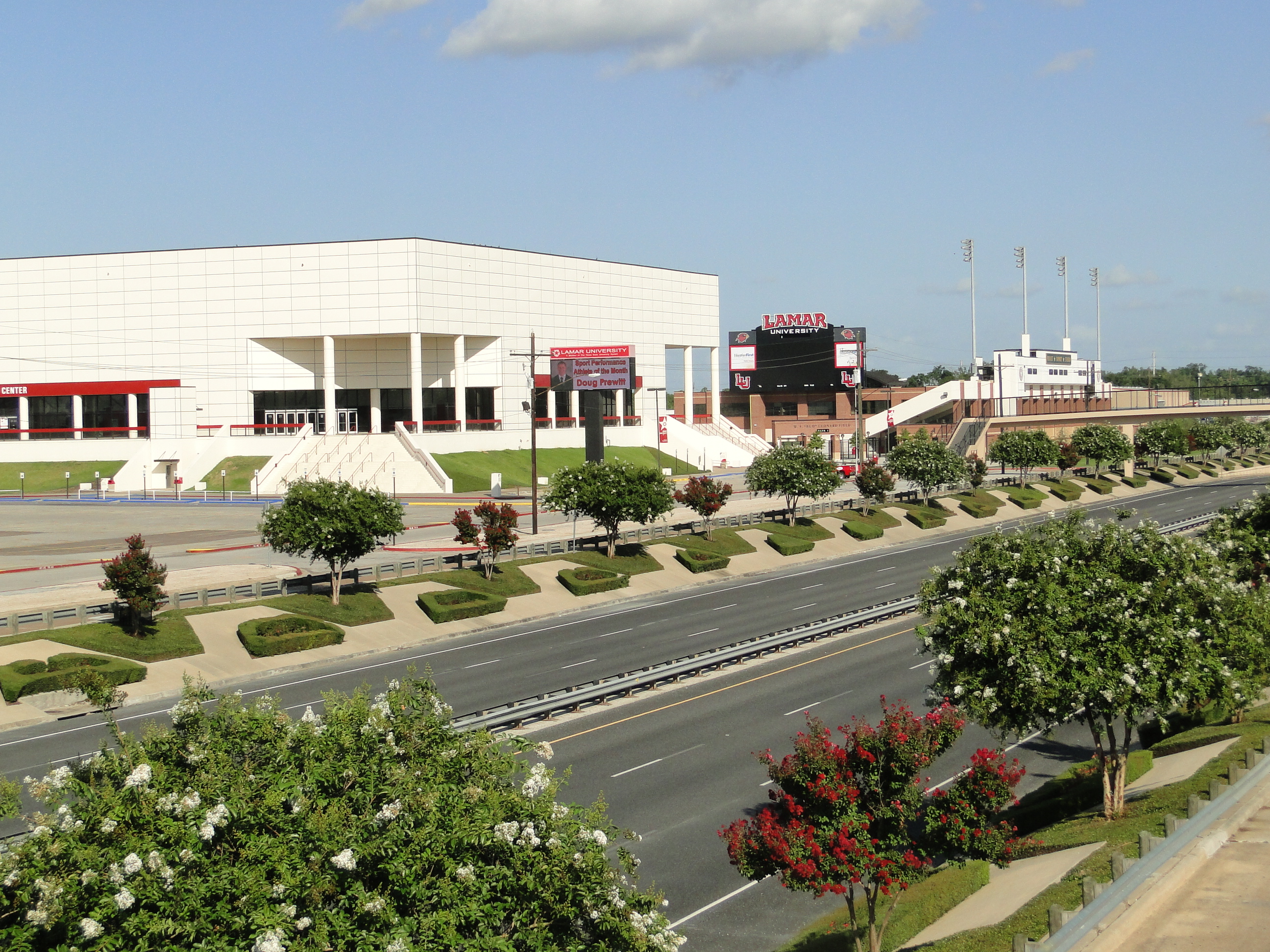
Lamar University sports complex, Beaumont

=== Collegiate ===
NCAA Division I programs
School	Nickname	Major Venues	Conference
University of Houston	Cougars	TDECU Stadium, Fertitta Center	Big 12 (FBS)
Lamar University	Cardinals	Provost Umphrey Stadium	Southland (FCS)
Rice University	Owls	Rice Stadium, Tudor Fieldhouse	American (FBS)
Houston Christian University	Huskies	Husky Stadium, Sharp Gymnasium	Southland (FCS)
Texas Southern University	Tigers	Health and Physical Education Arena	SWAC (FCS)
Prairie View A&M University (in Prairie View)	Panthers	Panther Stadium at Blackshear Field, William Nicks Building	SWAC (FCS)

== Transportation ==
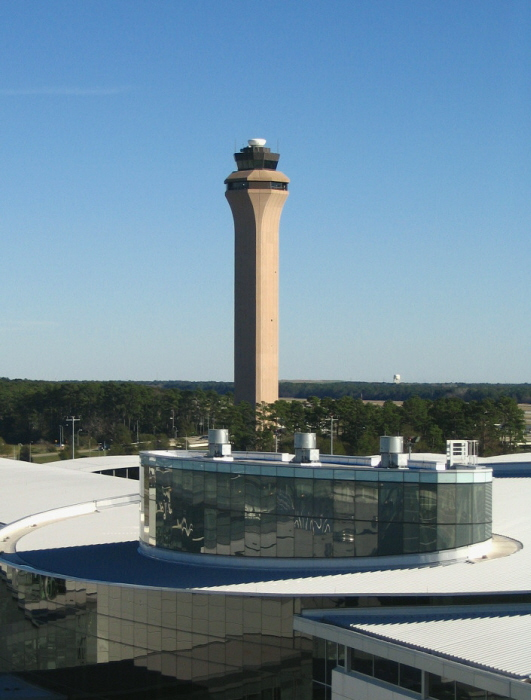
George Bush Intercontinental Airport

There are a variety of highways stretching between the Greater Houston and Beaumont metropolitan areas, connecting the communities to the remainder of the Gulf Coast region of the United States, and the Texas Triangle. Among other modes of transportation, the largest airports operating in Southeast Texas are all stationed in the city of Houston.

Designation	Common name	Year of First Freeway Section	Maximum width: mainlanes (HOV)	Maximum Traffic Count, 2001 (AADT)	Maximum Traffic Count, 2009 (AADT)	Maximum Traffic Count, 2012 (AADT)
I-10	Baytown-East Freeway	1953	10	225,640	195,000	168,000
I-10	Katy Freeway	1956	26(4)	238,520	268,000	360,000
I-45	Gulf Freeway	1948	8(1)	269,570	266,000	245,000
I-45	North Freeway	1959	10(1)	291,470	317,000	312,000
I-69 / US 59	Eastex Freeway	1953	10(1)	211,860	195,000	205,000
I-69 / US 59	Southwest Freeway	1961	13(1)	379,550	329,000	318,000
I-610	610 Loop	1952	10	293,460	288,000	292,000
Sam Houston Tollway	Beltway 8	1982	9	202,900	189,000	203,410**
Fort Bend Tollway	Fort Bend Parkway Toll Road	2004	4		9,471**	
Hardy Toll Road		1987	6	59,220	61,000	63,000
Westpark Tollway		2004	4		119,385**	
US 90	Crosby Freeway	1991	6	31,090	46,000	40,000
US 290	Northwest Freeway	1975	8(1)	262,970	230,000	239,000
Spur 5	Spur 5	1988	6	54,240	37,000	33,000
Spur 330	Decker Drive	2001	6	32,890	37,000	47,000
Spur 527	The Downtown Split	1961	6*	93,410	64,000	65,000
SH 99 / SH 99 Toll	Grand Parkway	1994	4	36,200	68,000	47,000
SH 146	Baytown Freeway	1996	8	74,670	73,000	76,000
SH 225	La Porte Freeway	1966	8	152,780	133,000	113,000
SH 249 / Tomball Tollway	Tomball Parkway	1990	8	119,780	142,000	151,000
SH 288	South Freeway	1980	8	178,490	172,000	163,000
FM 1764	Emmett F. Lowry Expressway		4	48,050	40,000	35,000
** For these toll roads, this represents the highest AADT as measured at a toll booth, but not necessarily the highest traffic at any point along the toll road.
