= Texas's 18th House of Representatives district =

Texas's 18th State House of Representatives district
Representative
Janis Holt; R
- Demographics: 68.6% White; 8.2% Black; 21.2% Hispanic; 0.8% Asian; 1.2% Other
- Population (2021) • Voting age: 199,901; 147,206

District 18 is a district in the Texas House of Representatives.

The district has been represented by Republican Janis Holt since January 14, 2025.

As a result of redistricting after the 2020 Federal census, from the 2022 elections, the district encompasses San Jacinto, Liberty and Hardin counties in East Texas.
