= Reagan Doctrine =

1980s U.S. strategy to counter Soviet influence

- 1981–1989
Détente / Carter Doctrine	New world order / Bush Doctrine
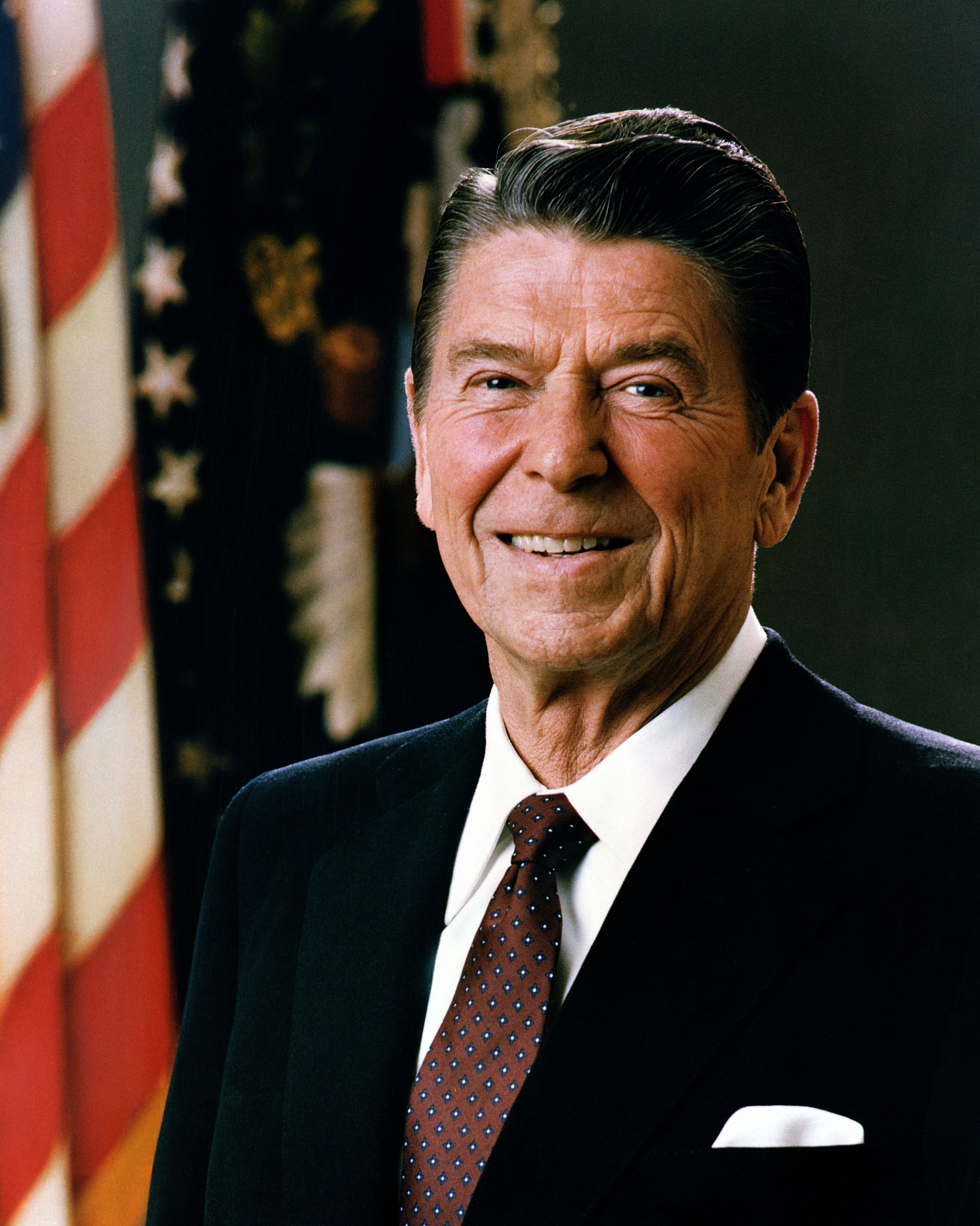
- Official presidential portrait
- Location: Global (primarily United States, Afghanistan, Nicaragua, Angola, and Cambodia)
- Including: Monroe Doctrine expansion (focused on the anti-communist rollback of Soviet-backed regimes in the Western Hemisphere, such as in Nicaragua and Grenada)
- Leaders: William J. Casey; Jeane Kirkpatrick; Caspar Weinberger
- President: Ronald Reagan
- Key events: Soviet–Afghan War (Covert aid via Operation Cyclone); Contra War in Nicaragua; Support for UNITA in the Angolan Civil War; Invasion of Grenada (1983)

The Reagan Doctrine was a United States foreign policy strategy implemented by the administration of President Ronald Reagan and continued under the George H. W. Bush administration designed to overwhelm the global influence of the Soviet Union during the final years of Cold War. The doctrine was a centerpiece and policy priority of the Reagan administration.

Reagan initially described the doctrine in his 1985 State of the Union Address, saying: "We must not break faith with those who are risking their lives—on every continent from Afghanistan to Nicaragua—to defy Soviet-supported aggression and secure rights which have been ours from birth." The doctrine was a centerpiece of U.S. foreign policy from the early 1980s until the end of the Cold War in 1991.

Under the Reagan Doctrine, the United States provided overt and covert aid to anti-communist guerrillas and resistance movements in an effort to roll back Soviet-backed pro-communist governments in Africa, Asia, and Latin America. The doctrine was designed to diminish Soviet influence in these regions as part of the administration's overall strategy to win the Cold War.

== Background ==
The Reagan Doctrine followed in the tradition of U.S. presidents developing foreign policy doctrines, which were designed to reflect challenges facing international relations, and to propose foreign policy solutions. The practice began with the Monroe Doctrine, implemented by U.S. president James Monroe in 1823. It continued with the Roosevelt Corollary, sometimes called the Roosevelt Doctrine, introduced by President Theodore Roosevelt in 1904.

Following World War II, in 1947, the Truman Doctrine was implemented, under which the U.S. supported Greece and Turkey as part of a Cold War strategy to keep both nations out of the Soviet Union's sphere of influence. It was followed by the Eisenhower Doctrine, the Kennedy Doctrine, the Johnson Doctrine, the Nixon Doctrine, and the Carter Doctrine, all of which defined the foreign policy approaches of these respective U.S. presidents on some of the largest global challenges of their respective presidencies.

== Origins ==
=== Carter administration and Afghanistan ===
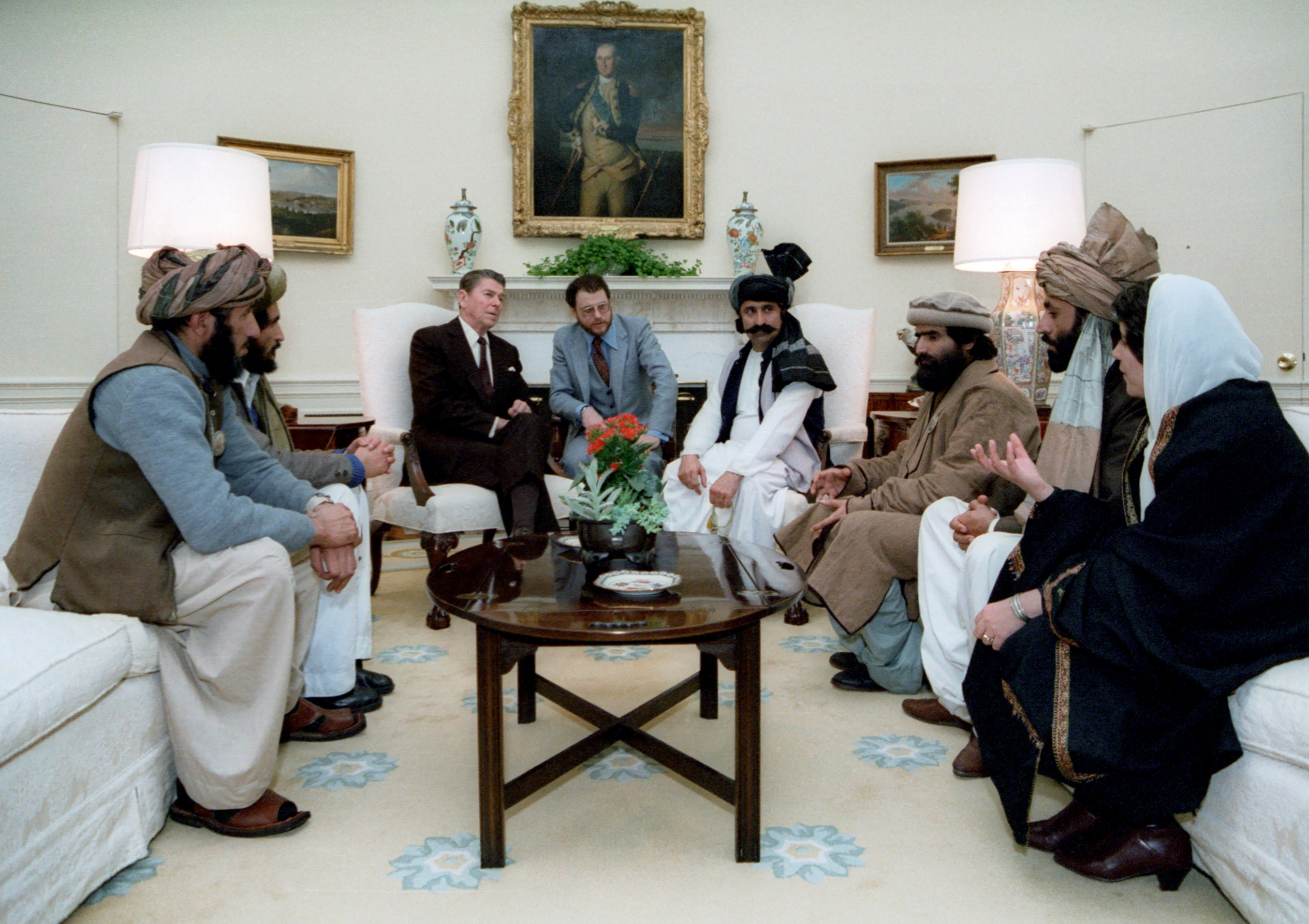
President Reagan meeting with Afghan mujahideen leaders in the Oval Office in 1983

To watch the courageous Afghan freedom fighters battle modern arsenals with simple hand-held weapons is an inspiration to those who love freedom.

— U.S. President Ronald Reagan, March 21, 1983

At least one component of the Reagan Doctrine technically pre-dated the Reagan administration. In Afghanistan, the Carter administration began providing limited covert military assistance to the Afghan mujahideen in an effort to drive the Soviets out of Afghanistan following their 1979 invasion and occupation of the country, or at least raise the military and political cost of the Soviet occupation of Afghanistan. The policy of aiding the mujahideen in their war against the Soviet occupation was originally proposed by Carter's National Security Advisor Zbigniew Brzezinski and was implemented by U.S. intelligence services. It enjoyed broad bipartisan political support.

Democratic congressman Charlie Wilson became obsessed with the Afghan cause, and was able to leverage his position on the House Appropriations committees to encourage other Democratic congressmen to vote for CIA Afghan war money, with the tacit approval of Speaker of the House Tip O'Neill, even as the Democratic Party lambasted Reagan for the CIA's secret war in Central America. It was a complex web of relationships described in George Crile III's book Charlie Wilson's War.

Wilson partnered with Gust Avrakotos, a CIA officer, to create a small team that expanded U.S. support for the mujahideen, which was channeled through Pakistani president Zia-ul-Haq’s Inter-Services Intelligence (ISI). Avrakotos and Wilson charmed leaders from various anti-Soviet countries including Egypt, Saudi Arabia, Israel, and China to increase support for the rebels. Avrakotos hired Michael G. Vickers, a young paramilitary officer, to enhance the guerilla's odds by revamping the tactics, weapons, logistics, and training used by the mujahideen. Michael Pillsbury, a Pentagon official, and Vincent Cannistraro pushed the CIA to supply Stinger missiles to the rebels. Reagan's covert action program has been given credit for assisting in ending the Soviet occupation of Afghanistan.

== Origin and advocates ==
With the arrival of the Reagan administration, The Heritage Foundation and other conservative foreign policy think tanks saw a political opportunity to significantly expand Carter's Afghanistan policy into a more global "doctrine", including U.S. support to anti-communist resistance movements in Soviet-allied nations in Africa, Asia, and Latin America. According to political analysts Thomas Bodenheimer and Robert Gould, "it was the Heritage Foundation that translated theory into concrete policy. Heritage targeted nine nations for regime change: Afghanistan, Angola, Cambodia, Ethiopia, Iran, Laos, Libya, Nicaragua, and Vietnam".

Throughout the 1980s, the Heritage Foundation's foreign policy expert on the Third World, Michael Johns, the foundation's principal Reagan Doctrine advocate, visited with resistance movements in Angola, Cambodia, Nicaragua, and other Soviet-supported nations and urged the Reagan administration to initiate or expand military and political support to them. Heritage Foundation foreign policy experts also endorsed the Reagan Doctrine in two of their Mandate for Leadership books, which provided comprehensive policy advice to Reagan administration officials.

In practice, U.S. aid under the doctrine was primarily concentrated in Afghanistan, Angola, Cambodia, Nicaragua, and, to a lesser extent, Mozambique, while Afghanistan was the centerpiece of the doctrine.

The result was that, unlike in Afghanistan, the Reagan Doctrine was rather quickly applied in Angola and Nicaragua, with the United States providing military support to the UNITA movement in Angola and the Contras in Nicaragua, but without a declaration of war against either country. Addressing the Heritage Foundation in October 1989, UNITA leader Jonas Savimbi called the efforts "a source of great support. No Angolan will forget your efforts. You have come to Jamba, and you have taken our message to Congress and the Administration". U.S. aid to UNITA began to flow overtly after Congress repealed the Clark Amendment, a long-standing legislative prohibition on military aid to UNITA.

Following these victories, Johns and the Heritage Foundation urged further expanding the Reagan Doctrine to Ethiopia, where they argued that the Ethiopian famine was a product of the military and agricultural policies of Ethiopia's Soviet-supported government under Mengistu Haile Mariam. Johns and Heritage also argued that Mengistu's decision to permit Soviet naval and air presence on the Red Sea ports of Eritrea represented a strategic challenge to U.S. security interests in the Middle East and North Africa.

The Heritage Foundation and the Reagan administration also sought to apply the Reagan Doctrine in Cambodia. The largest resistance movement fighting Cambodia's communist government was largely made up of members of the former Khmer Rouge regime, whose human rights record was among the worst of the 20th century. Therefore, Reagan authorized the provision of aid to a smaller Cambodian resistance movement, a coalition called the Khmer People's National Liberation Front, known as the KPNLF and then run by Son Sann; in an effort to force an end to the Vietnamese occupation.

While the Reagan Doctrine enjoyed strong support from the Heritage Foundation and the American Enterprise Institute, the libertarian-oriented Cato Institute opposed the Reagan Doctrine, arguing that, "most Third World struggles take place in arenas and involve issues far removed from legitimate American security needs. U.S. involvement in such conflicts expands the republic's already overextended commitments without achieving any significant prospective gains. Instead of draining Soviet military and financial resources, we end up dissipating our own."

However, even the Cato Institute conceded that the Reagan Doctrine had "fired the enthusiasm of the conservative movement in the United States as no foreign policy issue has done in decades".

Following the end of the Cold War, The Wall Street Journal reported that, during Mikhail Gorbachev's summits with Reagan during the late 1980s, Gorbachev complained that he believed the Heritage Foundation's extensive and unyielding support for the Reagan Doctrine was contributing to Reagan's unwillingness to abandon the doctrine.

=== Reagan administration advocates ===
Within the Reagan administration, the doctrine was quickly embraced by nearly all of Reagan's top national security and foreign policy officials, including Defense Secretary Caspar Weinberger, UN Ambassador Jeane Kirkpatrick, and a series of National Security Advisors appointed by Reagan including John Poindexter, Frank Carlucci, and Colin Powell.

Reagan himself was a vocal proponent of the policy. Seeking to expand congressional support for the doctrine in his 1985 State of the Union Address in February 1985, Reagan said: "We must not break faith with those who are risking their lives ... on every continent, from Afghanistan to Nicaragua ... to defy Soviet aggression and secure rights which have been ours from birth. Support for freedom fighters is self-defense".

As part of his effort to gain congressional support for the Nicaraguan Contras, Reagan labeled the Contras "the moral equivalent of our founding fathers", which was controversial because the Contras had shown disregard for human rights. There also were allegations that some members of the Contra leadership were involved in cocaine trafficking.

Reagan and other conservative advocates of the Reagan Doctrine advocates also argued that the doctrine served U.S. foreign policy and strategic objectives and was a moral imperative against the Soviet Union, which Reagan, his advisers, and supporters labeled an "evil empire".

=== Other advocates ===
Other early conservative advocates for the Reagan Doctrine included influential activist Grover Norquist, who ultimately became a registered UNITA lobbyist and an economic adviser to Savimbi's UNITA movement in Angola, and former Reagan speechwriter and former U.S. congressman Dana Rohrabacher, who made several secret visits with the mujahideen in Afghanistan and returned with glowing reports of their bravery against the Soviet occupation. Rohrabacher was led to Afghanistan by his contact with the mujahideen, Jack Wheeler.

=== Etymology ===
In 1985, as U.S. support was flowing to the mujahideen, Savimbi's UNITA, and the Nicaraguan Contras, columnist Charles Krauthammer, in an essay for Time magazine, labeled the policy the "Reagan Doctrine," and the name stuck.

Krauthammer later said:

I basically came to the conclusion ... the Soviets had overextended their empire, and they were getting what the West had gotten with its overextended empire decades before a reaction, they got a rebellion, they got resistance. And the Soviets were now beginning to feel it, and the genius of Reagan, although I don't think they had a plan in doing this is he instinctively realized that one of the ways to go after the Soviets was indirect, and that is you go after their proxies, you go after their allies, you go after their clients, or even in Afghanistan you go after them directly. So that's what I called the Reagan Doctrine, it was sort of the opposite of the Brezhnev Doctrine, which was whatever we control we keep. And Reagan was saying, no you don't.

=== "Rollback" replaces "containment" and "détente" ===
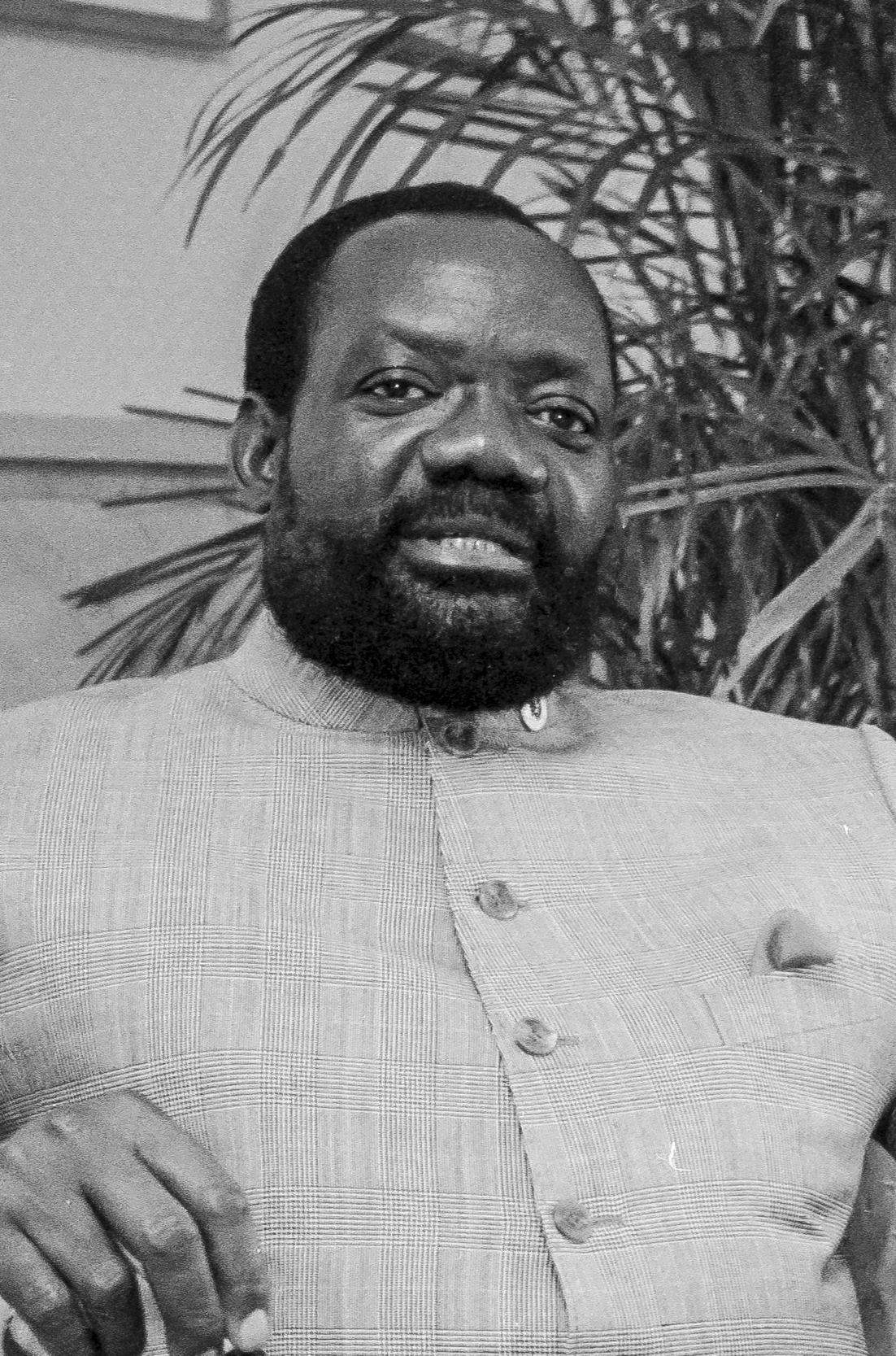
Jonas Savimbi, who led the U.S.-supported UNITA resistance movement in Angola from its founding until being killed in action in a firefight with Angolan troops in Moxico Province in 2002

The Reagan Doctrine was especially significant because it represented a substantial shift in the post–World War II foreign policy of the United States. Prior to the Reagan Doctrine, U.S. foreign policy in the Cold War was rooted in containment, as originally defined by George F. Kennan, John Foster Dulles, and other post–World War II U.S. foreign policy experts. In January 1977, four years prior to becoming president, Reagan described his objectives in the Cold War to his future National Security Advisor Richard V. Allen, saying: "My idea of American policy toward the Soviet Union is simple, and some would say simplistic. It is this: We win and they lose. What do you think of that?"

Fearing an escalation of the Cold War and possible nuclear conflict, however, the U.S. chose not to confront the Soviet Union directly. The emergence of the Reagan Doctrine set those fears aside while still permitting the U.S. to begin confronting Soviet-supported governments through support of rebel movements in the doctrine's targeted countries.

One perceived benefit of the Reagan Doctrine was the relatively low cost of supporting guerrilla forces compared to the Soviet Union's expenses in propping up client states. Another benefit was the lack of direct involvement of American troops, which allowed the U.S. to confront Soviet allies without directly sustaining casualties. Since the September 11 attacks, however, some Reagan Doctrine critics have argued that, by facilitating the transfer of large amounts of weapons to various areas of the world and by training military leaders in these regions, the Reagan Doctrine actually contributed to "blowback by strengthening some political and military movements that ultimately developed hostility toward the U.S., including al-Qaeda in Afghanistan. However, no direct U.S. aid to Osama bin Laden or any of his affiliates has ever been established.

=== Nicaragua controversies ===
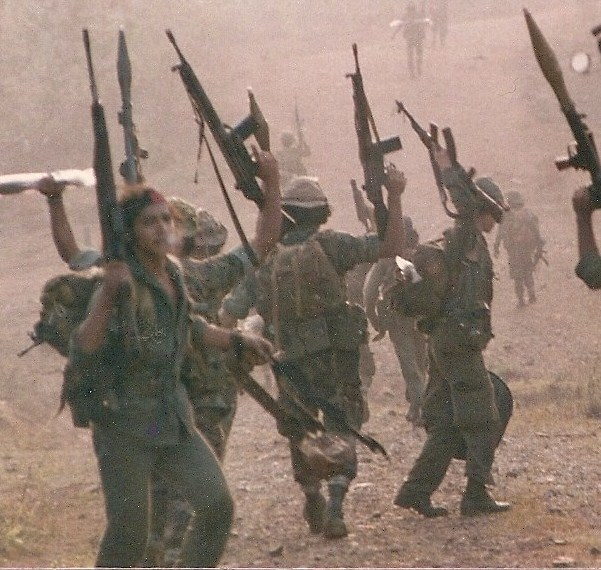
The Contras in Nicaragua in 1987

In 1984, a CIA manual, "Psychological Operations in the Guerrilla War," designed for training the Contras, leaked to the media. recommended "selective use of violence for propagandistic effects" and to "neutralize" government officials. The Contras were taught to lead:

... selective use of armed force for PSYOP psychological operations effect. ... Carefully selected, planned targets – judges, police officials, tax collectors, etc. – may be removed for PSYOP effect in a UWOA unconventional warfare operations area, but extensive precautions must insure that the people "concur" in such an act by thorough explanatory canvassing among the affected populace before and after conduct of the mission.

— James Bovard, Freedom Daily

In 1984, the International Court of Justice, in adjudicating the case of Nicaragua v. United States, found that the United States was obligated to pay reparations to Nicaragua because it had violated international law by actively supporting the Contras in their rebellion and by mining the Naval waters of Nicaragua. The U.S. refused to participate in the proceedings after the Court rejected its argument that the ICJ lacked jurisdiction to hear the case. The U.S. later blocked the enforcement of the judgment by exercising its veto power in the United Nations Security Council and so prevented Nicaragua from obtaining any actual compensation.

In 2003, Colombia's former ambassador to Cuba charged in her book Masters of War that, "the CIA launched a series of terrorist actions from the "mothership" off Nicaragua's coast. In September 1983, she alleged that the agency attacked Puerto Sandino, Nicaragua's largest port, with rockets. The following month, frogmen blew up the underwater oil pipeline in the same port – the only one in the country. In October there was an attack on Puerto Corinto with mortars, rockets, and grenades blowing up five large oil and gasoline storage tanks. More than a hundred people were wounded, and the fierce fire, which could not be brought under control for two days, forced the evacuation of 23,000 people."

In his 2004 book, State Terrorism and the United States, Frederick H. Gareau, a Florida State University international affairs professor, wrote that the Contras "attacked bridges, electric generators, but also state-owned agricultural cooperatives, rural health clinics, villages, and non-combatants". U.S. agents were directly involved in the fighting. "CIA commandos launched a series of sabotage raids on Nicaraguan port facilities. They mined the country's major ports and set fire to its largest oil storage facilities." In 1984, Congress ordered this intervention to be stopped; however, it was later shown that the Reagan administration illegally continued (see Iran–Contra affair). Gareau has characterized these acts as "wholesale terrorism" by the United States.

In his 2007 book, The United States and the Rise of the New Imperialism, Greg Grandin, a Yale University history professor, described a disjuncture between official ideals preached by the United States and actual U.S. support for terrorism. "Nicaragua, where the United States backed not a counter insurgent state but anti-communist mercenaries, likewise represented a disjuncture between the idealism used to justify U.S. policy and its support for political terrorism....The corollary to the idealism embraced by the Republicans in the realm of diplomatic public policy debate was thus political terror. In the dirtiest of Latin America's dirty wars, their faith in America's mission justified atrocities in the name of liberty". Grandin examined the behavior of the U.S.-backed Contras and found evidence that it was particularly inhumane and vicious: "In Nicaragua, the U.S.-backed Contras decapitated, castrated, and otherwise mutilated civilians and foreign aid workers. Some earned a reputation for using spoons to gouge their victims' eyes out. In one raid, Contras cut the breasts of a civilian defender to pieces and ripped the flesh off the bones of another."

=== Covert implementation ===
As the Reagan administration set about implementing the Heritage Foundation's plan in Afghanistan, Angola, Cambodia, and Nicaragua, it first attempted to do so covertly, not as part of official policy. "The Reagan government's initial implementation of the Heritage plan was done covertly", according to the book Rollback, "following the longstanding custom that containment can be overt but rollback should be covert". Ultimately, however, the administration supported the policy more openly.

=== Congressional support ===
While the doctrine benefited from strong support from the Reagan administration, the Heritage Foundation and several influential members of Congress, many votes on critical funding for resistance movements, especially the Nicaraguan Contras, were extremely close, making the Reagan Doctrine one of the more contentious American political issues of the 1980s.

=== End of the Cold War ===
As arms flowed to the Contras, Savimbi's UNITA, and the mujahideen, advocates of the Reagan Doctrine argued that the doctrine was yielding constructive results for U.S. interests and global democracy.

In Nicaragua, pressure from the Contras led the Sandinstas to end the State of Emergency, and they subsequently lost the 1990 elections. In Afghanistan, the mujahideen bled the Soviet Union's military and paved the way for Soviet military defeat. In Angola, Savimbi's resistance ultimately led to a decision by the Soviet Union and Cuba to bring their troops and military advisors home from Angola as part of a negotiated settlement.

All of these developments were Reagan Doctrine victories, the doctrine's advocates argue, laying the ground for the ultimate dissolution of the Soviet Union. Johns later argued that "the Reagan-led effort to support freedom fighters resisting Soviet oppression led successfully to the first major military defeat of the Soviet Union ... Sending the Red Army packing from Afghanistan proved one of the single most important contributing factors in one of history's most profoundly positive and important developments".

The Reagan Doctrine continued into the administration of Reagan's successor, George H. W. Bush, who won the presidency in November 1988. Bush's presidency featured the final years of the Cold War and the Gulf War, but the Reagan Doctrine soon faded from U.S. policy as the Cold War ended. Bush also noted a presumed peace dividend to the end of the Cold War with economic benefits of a decrease in defense spending. However, following the presidency of Bill Clinton, a change in United States foreign policy was introduced with the presidency of his son George W. Bush and the new Bush Doctrine, who increased military spending in response to the September 11 attacks.

In Nicaragua, the Contras war ultimately ended after the Sandinista government. Facing military and political pressure, agreed to new elections, in which the contras' political wing participated, in 1990. In Angola, an agreement in 1989 met Savimbi's demand for the removal of Soviet, Cuban, and other military troops and advisors from Angola. Also in 1989, in relation to Afghanistan, Soviet leader Mikhail Gorbachev labeled the war against the U.S.-supported mujahideen a "bleeding wound" and ended the Soviet occupation of the country.

== Views ==
=== Margaret Thatcher ===
Among others, Margaret Thatcher, Prime Minister of the United Kingdom from 1979 to 1990, credited the Reagan Doctrine with aiding the end of the Cold War. In December 1997, Thatcher said that the Reagan Doctrine "proclaimed that the truce with communism was over. The West would henceforth regard no area of the world as destined to forego [sic] its liberty simply because the Soviets claimed it to be within their sphere of influence. We would fight a battle of ideas against communism, and we would give material support to those who fought to recover their nations from tyranny".

== Controversies ==
=== Iran–Contra affair ===
U.S. funding for the Contras, who opposed the Sandinista government of Nicaragua, was obtained from covert sources. Congress did not authorize sufficient funds for the Contras' efforts, and the Boland Amendment barred further funding. In 1986, in an episode that became known as the Iran–Contra affair, the Reagan administration illegally facilitated the sale of arms to Iran, the subject of an arms embargo, in the hope that the arms sales would secure the release of hostages and allow U.S. intelligence agencies to fund the Contras.

== In popular culture ==
- Charlie Wilson's War, a Golden Globe Award and Oscar-nominated Universal Pictures film released in December 2007, depicts early U.S. efforts to provide military support to the Afghan mujahideen following the Soviet invasion of Afghanistan.
- Miami, a 1987 book by Joan Didion covers U.S. efforts to overthrow communist governments, including that of Fidel Castro in Cuba.

== See also ==
- Deterrence theory
- Kirkpatrick Doctrine
- Latin America–United States relations
- Peace through strength
- Project Socrates
