= Charlie Wilson's War =

Charlie Wilson's War may refer to:

- Charlie Wilson's War (book), a 2003 book by George Crile III
- Charlie Wilson's War (film), a 2007 film directed by Mike Nichols based on the book
