= Operation Cyclone =

1970s–90s CIA program to fund Afghan militants

- Part of the Soviet–Afghan War
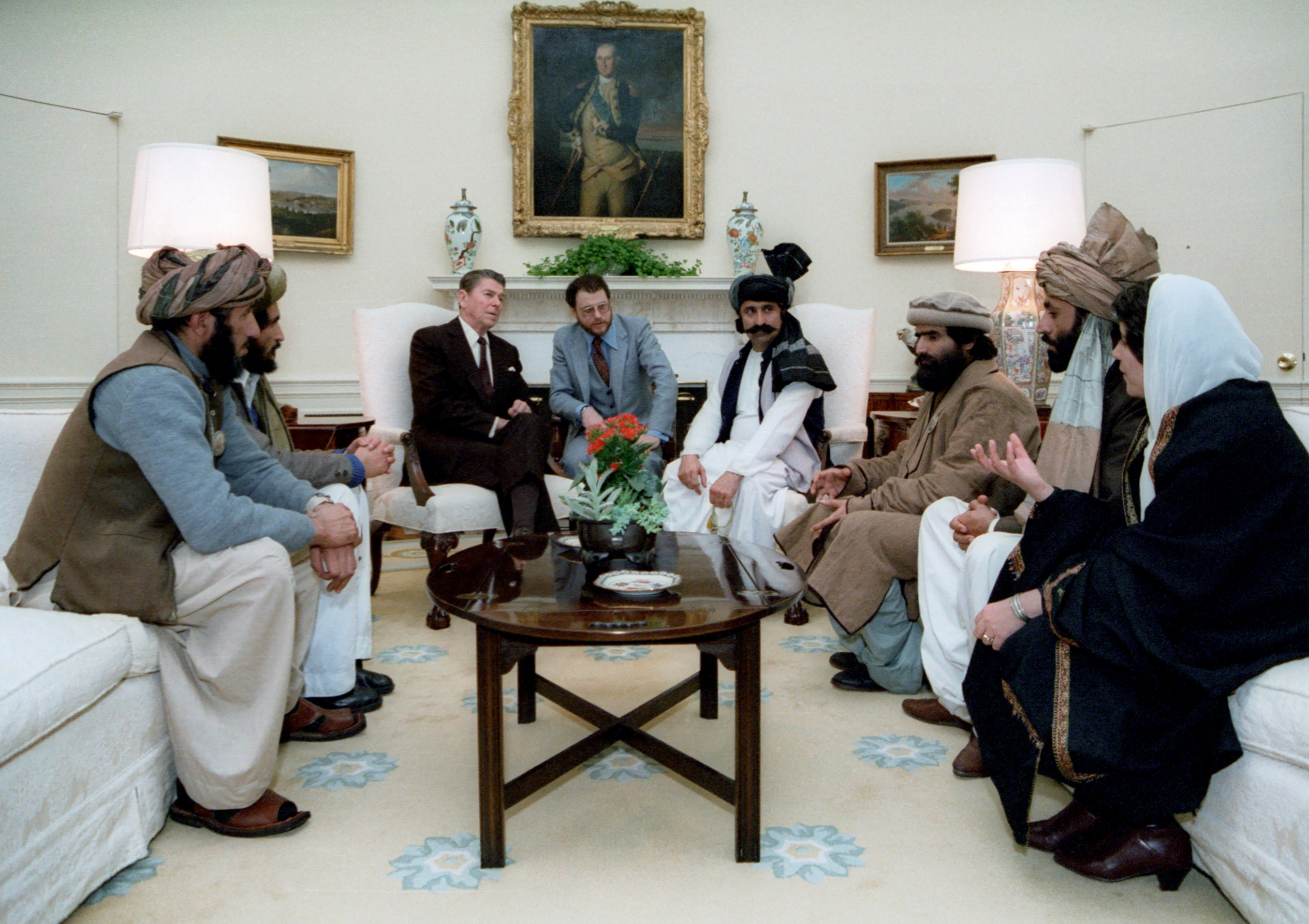
- President Reagan meeting with Afghan Mujahideen leaders in the Oval Office in 1983
- Operational scope: Weapons sales, training and financing of Afghan mujahideen forces
- Type: Covert operation
- Location: Democratic Republic of Afghanistan
- Planned by: Inter-Services Intelligence (ISI); Central Intelligence Agency (CIA); Saudi intelligence
- Target: Government of Afghanistan and Soviet invasion force
- Objective: Arm, train, and finance the mujahideen
- Date: 3 July 1979–1992
- Outcome: Training of tens of thousands of Mujahidin and delivery to them of thousands of tons of weaponry worth several billion US dollars.; Soviet withdrawal from Afghanistan in February 1989.; Collapse of the Democratic Republic of Afghanistan in 1992.

Operation Cyclone was the code name for the United States Central Intelligence Agency (CIA) program to arm and finance the Afghan mujahideen in Afghanistan from 1979 to 1992, prior to and during the military intervention by the Soviet Union in support of the Democratic Republic of Afghanistan. The mujahideen were also supported by Britain's MI6, who conducted their own separate covert actions.

The program leaned heavily towards supporting militant Islamic groups, including groups with jihadist ties, that were favored by the regime of Muhammad Zia-ul-Haq in neighboring Pakistan, rather than other, less ideological Afghan resistance groups that had also been fighting the Soviet-oriented Democratic Republic of Afghanistan administration since before the Soviet intervention.

Operation Cyclone was one of the longest and most expensive covert CIA operations ever undertaken. Funding officially began with $695,000 USD in mid-1979, was increased dramatically to $20–$30 million per year in 1980, and rose to $630 million per year in 1987, described as the "biggest bequest to any Third World insurgency". Operation Cyclone is recognized by the Guinness World Records as the most expensive covert action in history.

The first CIA-supplied weapons were antique British Lee–Enfield rifles shipped out in December 1979. By September 1986, the program included American-made state-of-the-art weaponry, such as FIM-92 Stinger surface-to-air missiles, some 2,300 of which were ultimately shipped into Afghanistan. Funding continued (albeit reduced) after the 1989 Soviet withdrawal, as the mujahideen continued to battle the Armed Forces of the Democratic Republic of Afghanistan during the First Afghan Civil War.

== Background ==
Under the leadership of Nur Muhammad Taraki, communists seized power in Afghanistan on 27 April 1978. The newly formed Democratic Republic of Afghanistan (DRA)—which was divided between Taraki's hardline Khalq faction and the more moderate Parcham—signed a treaty of friendship with the Soviet Union in December of that year. Taraki's efforts to improve secular education and redistribute land were accompanied by mass executions (including many conservative religious leaders) and political oppression unprecedented in Afghan history, igniting a revolt by Afghan mujahideen rebels, many of whom had been in exile in Pakistan following a failed uprising against the previous Republican regime in 1975.

Following a general uprising in April 1979, Taraki was deposed by Khalq's rival Hafizullah Amin in September. Amin was considered a "brutal psychopath" by foreign observers; the Soviets were particularly alarmed by the brutality of the late Khalq regime and suspected Amin, an admirer of Stalin, of being an agent of the U.S. Central Intelligence Agency (CIA). Although the CIA denied this, and several scholars have refuted any meaningful connection between Amin and the CIA, Amin once stated that he was funded by the CIA when he headed the Afghan student society during his studies at Columbia University in New York. Declassified U.S. government records and the testimony of Soviet officials document meetings between Amin and U.S. officials in the months preceding the Soviet-Afghan War. During meetings with Archer Blood and Bruce Amstutz, the U.S. chargé d'affaires in Kabul, Amin expressed a commitment to improve relations with the U.S. and stated that he operated independently of the USSR; Amin's meetings were apparently conducted in secret from Soviet officials.

In the late 1970s, Pakistani intelligence officials began privately lobbying the U.S. and its allies to send material assistance to the Islamist insurgents. Pakistani President Muhammad Zia-ul-Haq's ties with the U.S. had been strained during Jimmy Carter's presidency due to Pakistan's nuclear program and the execution of Zulfikar Ali Bhutto in April 1979, but Carter told National Security Advisor Zbigniew Brzezinski and Secretary of State Cyrus Vance as early as January 1979 that it was vital to "repair our relationships with Pakistan" in light of the unrest in Iran. According to former CIA official Robert Gates, "the Carter administration turned to CIA ... to counter Soviet and Cuban aggression in the Third World, particularly beginning in mid-1979." In March 1979, "CIA sent several covert action options relating to Afghanistan to the SCC [Special Coordination Committee]" of the United States National Security Council. At a 30 March meeting, U.S. Department of Defense representative Walter B. Slocombe "asked if there was value in keeping the Afghan insurgency going, 'sucking the Soviets into a Vietnamese quagmire?'" When asked to clarify this remark, Slocombe explained: "Well, the whole idea was that if the Soviets decided to strike at this tar baby [Afghanistan] we had every interest in making sure that they got stuck." But a 5 April memo from National Intelligence Officer Arnold Horelick warned: "Covert action would raise the costs to the Soviets and inflame Moslem opinion against them in many countries. The risk was that a substantial U.S. covert aid program could raise the stakes and induce the Soviets to intervene more directly and vigorously than otherwise intended."

In May 1979, U.S. officials secretly began meeting with rebel leaders through Pakistani government contacts. A former Pakistani military official claimed that he personally introduced a CIA official to Gulbuddin Hekmatyar that month. (Freedom of Information Act requests for records describing these meetings have been denied.) Additional meetings were held on 6 April and 3 July, and on the same day as the second meeting, Carter signed two presidential findings permitting the CIA to spend $695,000 on non-military assistance (e.g., "cash, medical equipment, and radio transmitters") and on a propaganda campaign targeting the Soviet-backed leadership of the DRA, which (in the words of Steve Coll) "seemed at the time a small beginning." Soviet leader Leonid Brezhnev was shocked by Amin's murder of Taraki with the Soviet Union invading the country in December 1979, killing Amin, and installing Parcham leader Babrak Karmal as president.

The full significance of the U.S. sending aid to the mujahideen prior to the invasion is debated among scholars. Some assert that it directly, and even deliberately, provoked the Soviets to send in troops. According to former CIA analyst Bruce Riedel, the consensus of the U.S. intelligence community during 1978 and 1979 was that "Moscow would not intervene in force even if it appeared likely that the Khalq government was about to collapse," and that U.S. aid to the mujahideen was primarily driven to improve relations with Pakistan. Coll asserts: "Contemporary memos—particularly those written in the first days after the Soviet invasion—make clear that while Brzezinski was determined to confront the Soviets in Afghanistan through covert action, he was also very worried the Soviets would prevail. ... Given this evidence and the enormous political and security costs that the invasion imposed on the Carter administration, any claim that Brzezinski lured the Soviets into Afghanistan warrants deep skepticism." According to Conor Tobin, citing declassified U.S. documents, writes that "a Soviet military intervention was neither sought nor desired by the Carter administration ... The small-scale covert program that developed in response to the increasing Soviet influence was part of a contingency plan if the Soviets did intervene militarily, as Washington would be in a better position to make it difficult for them to consolidate their position, but not designed to induce an intervention." In a review, Jonathan Haslam writes that Tobin's conclusions are "questionable," citing the incompleteness of U.S. archives; a meeting on 27 October between Brzezinski and the British Ambassador to the US Nicholas Henderson in which, per Henderson, Brzezinski "gave a hint of [U.S.] preparedness to do something to make life difficult for the Russians in Afghanistan"; and the testimony of several contemporary U.S. and Soviet officials who affirm that the U.S. sought to provoke the invasion, despite the fact that "the Russians were not just hesitant" in intervening, but "was trying to keep its distance while offering aid only in equipment and advice."

Carter's diary entries from November 1979 until the Soviet invasion in late December contain only two short references to Afghanistan, and are instead preoccupied with the ongoing Iran hostage crisis. In the West, the Soviet invasion of Afghanistan was considered a threat to global security and the oil supplies of the Persian Gulf. Moreover, U.S. officials reappraised the Soviet threat to both Iran and Pakistan, although it is now known that those fears were overblown. For example, U.S. intelligence closely followed Soviet exercises for an invasion of Iran throughout 1980, while an earlier warning from Brzezinski that "if the Soviets came to dominate Afghanistan, they could promote a separate Baluchistan ... [thus] dismembering Pakistan and Iran" took on new urgency.

In the aftermath of the invasion, Carter was determined to respond vigorously. In a televised speech, he announced sanctions on the Soviet Union, promised renewed aid to Pakistan, and committed the U.S. to the Persian Gulf's defense. Carter also called for a boycott of the 1980 Summer Olympics in Moscow, which raised a bitter controversy. British prime minister Margaret Thatcher enthusiastically backed Carter's tough stance, although British intelligence believed "the CIA was being too alarmist about the Soviet threat to Pakistan."

Although Director of Central Intelligence (DCI) Stansfield Turner and the CIA's Directorate of Operations (DO) were contemplating what Gates described as "several enhancement options"—up to and including the direct provision of arms from the U.S. to the mujahideen through the ISI—by October 1979, and an unnamed Brzezinski aide acknowledged in conversation with Selig S. Harrison that the U.S.'s nominally "non-lethal" assistance to the mujahideen included facilitating arms shipments by third-parties, Coll, Harrison, Riedel, and the head of the DO's Near East–South Asia Division at the time—Charles Cogan—all state that no U.S.-supplied arms intended for the mujahideen reached Pakistan until January 1980, after Carter amended his presidential finding to include lethal provisions in late December 1979. This is also corroborated by Tobin: "With the 'evidence of movement' of Soviet military forces detected near Afghanistan's borders, the SCC resolved on December 17 to 'explore with the Pakistanis and British the possibility of improving the financing, arming and communications of rebel forces to make it as expensive as possible for the Soviets to continue their efforts.' This likely meant increased financing of arms purchases rather than direct arms support, but the initiatives were not undertaken until after the invasion began, and no weapons were directly supplied before January 1980."

The thrust of U.S. policy for the duration of the war was determined by Carter in early 1980: Carter initiated a program to arm the mujahideen through Pakistan's ISI and secured a pledge from Saudi Arabia to match U.S. funding for this purpose. U.S. support for the mujahideen accelerated under Carter's successor, Ronald Reagan, at a final cost to U.S. taxpayers of some $3 billion. The decision to route U.S. aid through Pakistan led to massive fraud, as weapons sent to Karachi were frequently sold on the local market rather than delivered to the Afghan rebels; Karachi soon "became one of the most violent cities in the world." Pakistan also controlled which rebels received assistance: Of the seven mujahideen groups supported by Zia's government, four espoused Islamic fundamentalist beliefs—and these fundamentalists received most of the funding. Despite this, Carter has expressed no regrets over his decision to support what he still considers the "freedom fighters" in Afghanistan.

== Program ==
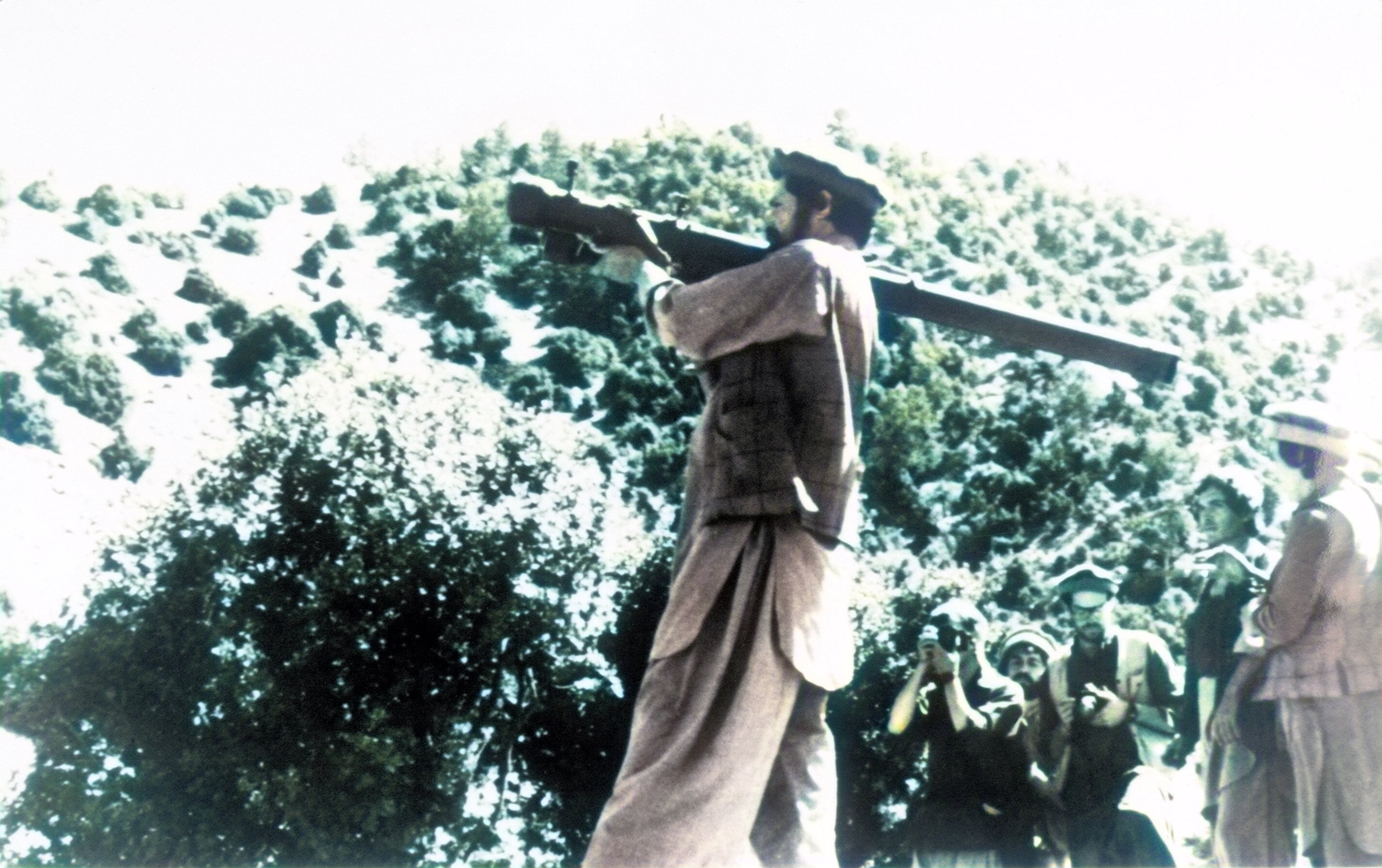
A mujahid shoots an SA-7, 1988.

Key proponents of the initial program were Texas Congressman Charlie Wilson; Michael G. Vickers, a young CIA paramilitary officer; and Gust Avrakotos, the CIA's regional head, who developed a close relationship with Wilson. Their strategy was to provide a broad mix of weapons, tactics, and logistics, along with training programs, to enhance the rebels' ability to fight a guerilla war against the Soviets. Initially, to avoid detection of U.S. involvement, the program supplied the rebels only with Soviet-made weaponry. This plan was enabled by the tacit support of Israel, which had captured large stockpiles of Soviet-made weaponry during the Yom Kippur War and agreed to sell them to the CIA clandestinely, as well as Egypt, which had recently modernized its army with weapons purchased from Western nations, funneling the older Soviet-made arms to the mujahideen. After 1985, as the Reagan administration announced that it would support anti-Soviet resistance movements globally (in what is now known as the Reagan Doctrine), there was no longer a need to obfuscate the origin of the weaponry; Pentagon senior official, Michael Pillsbury, successfully advocated providing U.S.-made weaponry, including large numbers of Stinger missiles, to the Afghan resistance.

The distribution of the weaponry relied heavily on the Pakistani President Muhammad Zia-ul-Haq, who had a personal relationship with Congressman Wilson. His Inter-Services Intelligence (ISI) was an intermediary for funds distribution, passing of weapons, military training and financial support to Afghan resistance groups. Along with funding from Saudi Arabia and the People's Republic of China, the ISI developed a complex infrastructure that was directly training 16,000 to 18,000 mujahideen fighters annually by early 1986 (and indirectly facilitating training for thousands of others by Afghans that had previously been recipients of ISI instruction). They encouraged the volunteers from the Arab states to join the Afghan resistance in its struggle against the Soviet troops based in Afghanistan. Zia also directed the ISI to establish contact with Israel's Mossad. Intelligence offices were set up at both countries' embassies in Washington, where the ISI, MI6, CIA and Mossad jointly ran the operation. During this operation, Israel supplied Soviet-made weaponry (seized from Palestinian militants) to the Afghan mujahideen. Pakistan and Israel cooperated very closely during the entirety of the conflict and the Pakistani military which was engaging Soviet aircraft and providing the mujahideen with funds and weapons—received a generous amount of Israeli armaments and aid as a result.

Reports show civilian personnel from the U.S. Department of State and the CIA frequently visited the Afghanistan-Pakistan border area during this time, and the US contributed generously to aiding Afghan refugees. CIA director William J. Casey secretly visited Pakistan numerous times to meet with the ISI officers managing the mujahideen, and personally observed the guerrillas training on at least one occasion. Coll reports that

Casey startled his Pakistani hosts by proposing that they take the Afghan war into enemy territory—into the Soviet Union itself. Casey wanted to ship subversive propaganda through Afghanistan to the Soviet Union's predominantly Muslim southern republics. The Pakistanis agreed, and the CIA soon supplied thousands of Korans, as well as books on Soviet atrocities in Uzbekistan and tracts on historical heroes of Uzbek nationalism, according to Pakistani and Western officials.

Other direct points of contact between the US government and mujahideen include the CIA flying Hekmatyar to the United States, where he was hosted by State Department official Zalmay Khalizad. Hekmatyar was invited to meet with President Reagan but refused, and was replaced at the White House's October 1985 conference with mujahideen by Younis Khalis, who publicly invited Reagan to convert to Islam. CIA Islamabad station chief Howard Hart developed a personal relationship with Abdul Haq, which was continued by Hart's successor, William Piekney, and led to the Afghan meeting both Reagan and Margaret Thatcher. Assistant Secretary of Defense Richard Armitage regularly met with mujahideen, particularly Burhanuddin Rabbani. CIA agents are also known to have given direct cash payments to Jalaluddin Haqqani.

The U.S.-built Stinger antiaircraft missile was supplied to the mujahideen in very large numbers beginning in 1986. The weapon struck a decisive blow to the Soviet war effort as it allowed the lightly armed Afghans to effectively defend against Soviet helicopter landings in strategic areas. The Stingers were so renowned and deadly that, in the 1990s, the U.S. conducted a "buy-back" program to keep unused missiles from falling into the hands of anti-American terrorists. This program may have been covertly renewed following the U.S. intervention in Afghanistan in late 2001, out of fear that remaining Stingers could be used against U.S. forces in the country.

The Stinger missiles supplied by the United States gave Afghan guerrillas, generally known as the Mujahideen, the ability to destroy the dreaded Mi-24D helicopter gunships deployed by the Soviets to enforce their control over Afghanistan. Three of the first four Stingers fired each took down a gunship. The guerrillas were now able to challenge Soviet control of the airspace above the battlefield.

— CIA – Central Intelligence Agency

Reagan's program assisted in ending the Soviet occupation in Afghanistan, with the Soviets unable to quell the insurgency. On 20 July 1987, the withdrawal of Soviet troops from the country was announced pursuant to the negotiations that led to the Geneva Accords of 1988, with the last Soviets leaving on 15 February 1989. Soviet forces suffered over 14,000 killed and missing, and over 50,000 wounded. The withdrawal helped precipitate the dissolution of the Soviet Union itself.

=== Funding ===
The U.S. offered two packages of economic assistance and military sales to support Pakistan's role in the war against the Soviet troops in Afghanistan. The first six-year assistance package (1981–1987) amounted to US$3.2 billion, equally divided between economic assistance and military sales. The U.S. also sold 40 F-16 aircraft to Pakistan during 1983–87 at a cost of $1.2 billion outside the assistance package. The second six-year assistance package (1987–1993) amounted to $4.2 billion. Out of this, $2.28 billion were allocated for economic assistance in the form of grants or loan that carried the interest rate of 2–3 per cent. The rest of the allocation ($1.74 billion) was in the form of credit for military purchases. In total, the combined U.S., Saudi, and Chinese aid to the mujahideen is valued at between $6–12 billion.

The mujahideen benefited from expanded foreign military support from the United States, Saudi Arabia, Pakistan, United Kingdom and other Muslim nations. Saudi Arabia in particular agreed to match dollar for dollar the money the CIA was sending to the Mujahideen. When Saudi payments were late, Wilson and Avrakotos would fly to Saudi Arabia to persuade the monarchy to fulfill its commitments.

Levels of support to the various Afghan factions varied. The ISI tended to favor vigorous Islamists like Hekmatyar's Hezb-e Islami Gulbuddin and Haqqani. Some Americans agreed. However, others favored the relative moderates like Ahmed Shah Massoud. These included two Heritage Foundation foreign policy analysts, Michael Johns and James A. Phillips, both of whom championed Massoud as the Afghan resistance leader most worthy of US support under the Reagan Doctrine.

=== Britain's support ===
Britain's MI6 supported one of the hardline Islamic groups commanded by Ahmad Shah Massoud, who they saw as an effective fighter. Despite the CIA's doubts about Massoud, he became a key MI6 ally; MI6 sent an annual mission of two of their officers as well as military instructors to Massoud and his fighters. Of the weapons given covertly—most were old British army Lee Enfields, some of which were purchased from Indian Army stocks, which proved popular amongst the Afghan resistance groups. Limpet mines, explosives, radios, intelligence, and around fifty Blowpipe Missile launchers with 300 Missiles were sent to the Afghan resistance. The Special Air Service meanwhile gave the resistance vital training inside and outside of Afghanistan.

== Aftermath ==
After the withdrawal of Soviet troops, the U.S.'s interest in Afghanistan declined. However, it did participate in the planning of a takeover of the Afghan city of Jalalabad alongside the ISI, but the mujahideen forces were no match against the Afghan Army in a conventional war. Direct American funding of Hekmatyar and his Hezb-i-Islami party was cut off immediately.

In October 1990, U.S. President George H. W. Bush refused to certify that Pakistan did not possess a nuclear explosive device, triggering the imposition of sanctions against Pakistan under the Pressler Amendment (1985) to the Foreign Assistance Act (1961). This disrupted the second assistance package offered in 1987 and discontinued economic assistance and military sales to Pakistan with the exception of the economic assistance already on its way to Pakistan. Military sales and training programs were abandoned as well and some of the Pakistani military officers under training in the U.S. were asked to return home.

As late as 1991 Charlie Wilson persuaded the House Intelligence Committee to continue the funding of the Mujahideen, providing them with $200 million for fiscal year 1992. With the matching funds from Saudi Arabia, this amounted to $400 million for that year. Afghan tribes were also delivered weapons which the United States captured from Iraq during the Gulf War.

In a 1998 interview with French news magazine Le Nouvel Observateur, Brzezinski was asked whether he regretted the operation having given arms and advice to future terrorists. Brzezinski was quoted as saying: "What is more important in world history? The Taliban or the collapse of the Soviet empire? Some agitated Moslems or the liberation of Central Europe and the end of the cold war?" In the context of disputed statements attributed to Brzezinski concerning the United States setting a "trap" for the Soviet Union, Tobin cautions that "there are, however, significant problems with [the Le Nouvel Observateur interview] as an historical source. ... the published remarks were heavily edited and Brzezinski has denied the article's accuracy on numerous occasions, asserting that it was 'not an interview, but excerpts from an interview that was originally supposed to be published in full but which they never checked with me for approval in the form that it did appear.' It is also likely a casualty of translation—being conducted in English, translated and printed in French, and reconverted to English—with the original statements becoming skewed and distorted in their edited and translated form."

== Criticism ==
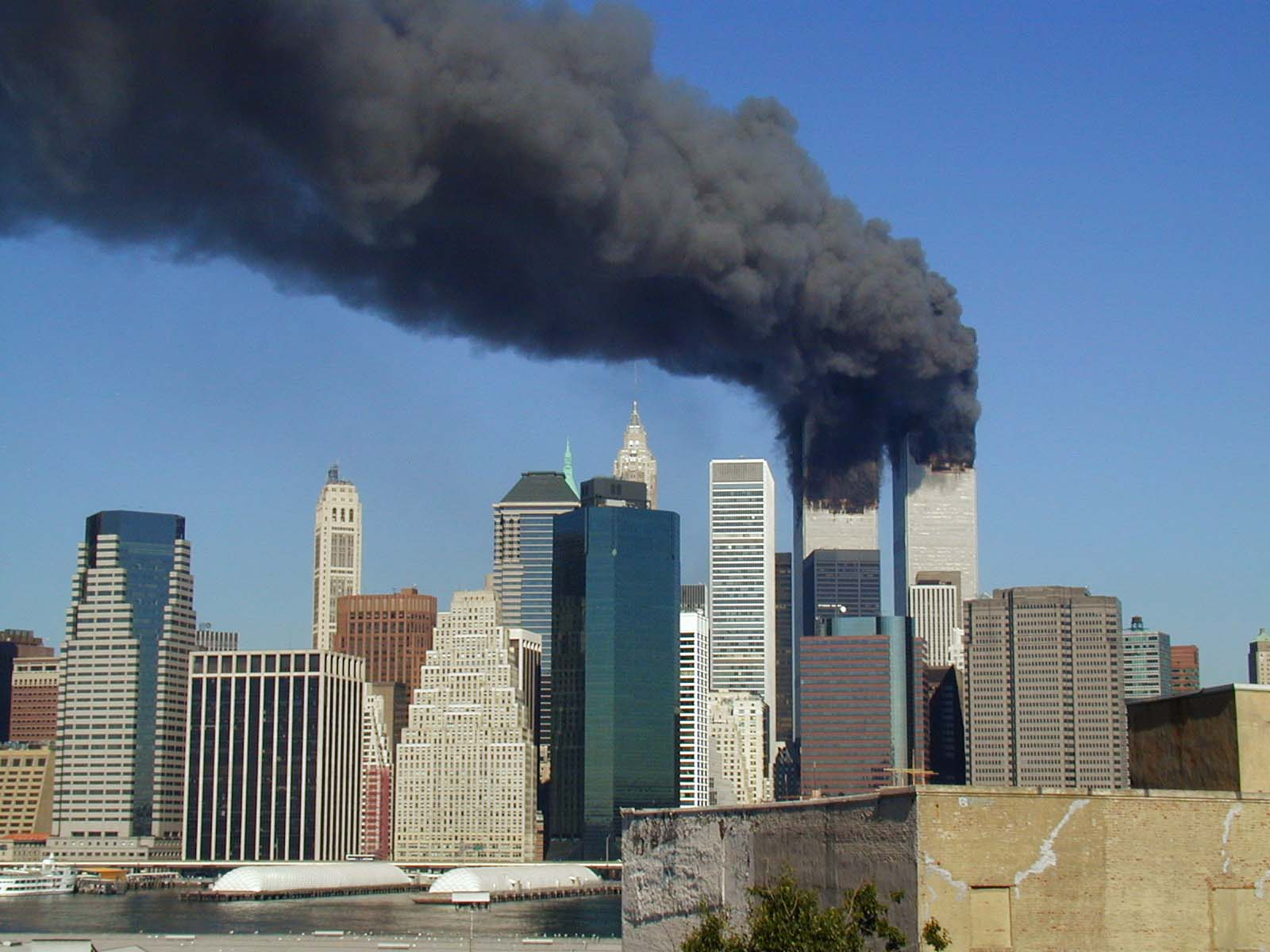
Critics assert that funding the mujahideen played a role in causing the September 11 attacks.

The U.S. government has been criticized for allowing Pakistan to channel a disproportionate amount of its funding to the controversial Hekmatyar, whom Pakistani officials believed was "their man". Hekmatyar has been criticized for killing other mujahideen and attacking civilian populations, including shelling Kabul with American-supplied weapons, causing 2,000 casualties. Hekmatyar was said to be friendly with Osama bin Laden, founder of al-Qaeda, who was running an operation for assisting "Afghan Arab" volunteers fighting in Afghanistan, called Maktab al-Khadamat. Alarmed by his behavior, Pakistan leader General Zia warned Hekmatyar, "It was Pakistan that made him an Afghan leader and it is Pakistan who can equally destroy him if he continues to misbehave." The CIA and State Department have been criticized for publishing textbooks intended to indoctrinate children with racism and hatred towards foreigners and towards non-Muslim Afghans. The CIA and State Department have also been criticized for their direct relationship with Hekmatyar, beyond ISI contact, in spite of his being one of the leading heroin smugglers in the region.

In the late 1980s, Pakistani prime minister Benazir Bhutto, concerned about the growing strength of the Islamist movement, told President George H. W. Bush, "You are creating a Frankenstein."

Others have asserted funding the mujahideen may have played a role in causing the September 11 attacks. A number of political commentators have described Al-Qaeda attacks as "blowback" or an unintended consequence of American aid to the mujahideen. Hillary Clinton, former United States Secretary of State, also commented in 2009 on how the actions of the U.S. helped to create an environment in which terrorist organizations like al-Qaeda could be born, even if the U.S. didn't directly create said groups.

The lion's share of funding given to mujahideen commander Gulbuddin Hekmatyar was also criticized, with one U.S. expert of the mujahideen telling The Washington Post:

I'd like to see the looks on their faces now over at Langley. They backed the wrong pony. They helped create Gulbuddin Hekmatyar.

== Allegations of CIA assistance to bin Laden ==
Several sources have argued that bin Laden and al-Qaeda were beneficiaries of the CIA's assistance program to the mujahideen. According to Peter Bergen, "there is simply no evidence for the common myth that bin Laden and his Afghan Arabs were supported by the CIA financially. Nor is there any evidence that CIA officials at any level met with bin Laden or anyone in his circle." Bergen insists that U.S. funding went to the Afghan mujahideen, not the Arab volunteers who arrived to assist them. Likewise, Thomas Hegghammer writes there is no proof for collaboration between the CIA and the Afghan Arabs and that it is a misconception "that Western and Arab governments engineered the Afghan Arab mobilization," arguing that "the evidence shows that the Afghan Arab mobilization was led overwhelmingly by non-state actors and that the main role of governments was simply not to obstruct it."

On the other hand, Ahmed Rashid writes that then-CIA chief William J. Casey "committed CIA support to a long-standing ISI initiative to recruit radical Muslims from around the world to come to Pakistan and fight with the Afghan Mujaheddin." Similarly, Odd Arne Westad writes that the CIA funded "Islamic charitable organizations that provided assistance to the mujahedin," and that "[a]t least two of these organizations also recruited Muslim volunteers—mostly from North Africa—to fight in Afghanistan," with the CIA also helping run training camps in Egypt and "probably one in one of the Gulf states" for both native Afghan and Afghan Arab recruits. Sir Martin Ewans noted that the Arabs foreign fighters "benefited indirectly from the CIA's funding, through the ISI and resistance organizations," and that "it has been reckoned that as many as 35,000 'Arab-Afghans' may have received military training in Pakistan at an estimated cost of $800 million in the years up to and including 1988." Steve Coll writes that "bin Laden moved within Saudi intelligence's compartmented operations, outside of CIA eyesight. CIA archives contain no record of any direct contact between a CIA officer and bin Laden during the 1980s," commenting that "[i]f the CIA did have contact with bin Laden during the 1980s and subsequently covered it up, it has so far done an excellent job." However, Coll nonetheless documents that bin Laden at least informally cooperated with the ISI during the 1980s, was "tapping into ISI's guerrilla training camps on behalf of newly arrived Arab jihadists," and had intimate connections to CIA-backed mujahideen commander Jalaluddin Haqqani. Some of the CIA's greatest Afghan beneficiaries were Arabist commanders such as Haqqani and Hekmatyar who were key allies of bin Laden over many years. Haqqani—one of bin Laden's closest associates in the 1980s—received direct cash payments from CIA agents, without the mediation of the ISI. This independent source of funding gave Haqqani disproportionate influence over the mujahideen. Haqqani and his network played an important role in the formation and growth of al Qaeda, with Haqqani allowing bin Laden to train mujahideen volunteers in Haqqani territory and build extensive infrastructure there. Milton Bearden, the CIA's Islamabad station chief from mid-1986 until mid-1989, took an admiring view of bin Laden at the time.

== See also ==
- 1985 Bakhtar Afghan Airlines Antonov An-26 shootdown
- 1987 Bakhtar Afghan Airlines Antonov An-26 shootdown
- Allegations of CIA assistance to Osama bin Laden
- Afghan Civil War
- Afghan training camp
- Abdullah Yusuf Azzam
- Badaber Uprising
- Charlie Wilson's War: The Extraordinary Story of the Largest Covert Operation in History
- Charlie Wilson's War
- CIA activities in Afghanistan
- Jalaluddin Haqqani
- Howard Hart
- Joanne Herring
- Ahmad Shah Massoud
- Gary Schroen
- Timber Sycamore
- United States involvement in regime change
- United States and state-sponsored terrorism
