= Michael G. Vickers =

American warfare theorist (born 1953)

Michael Vickers
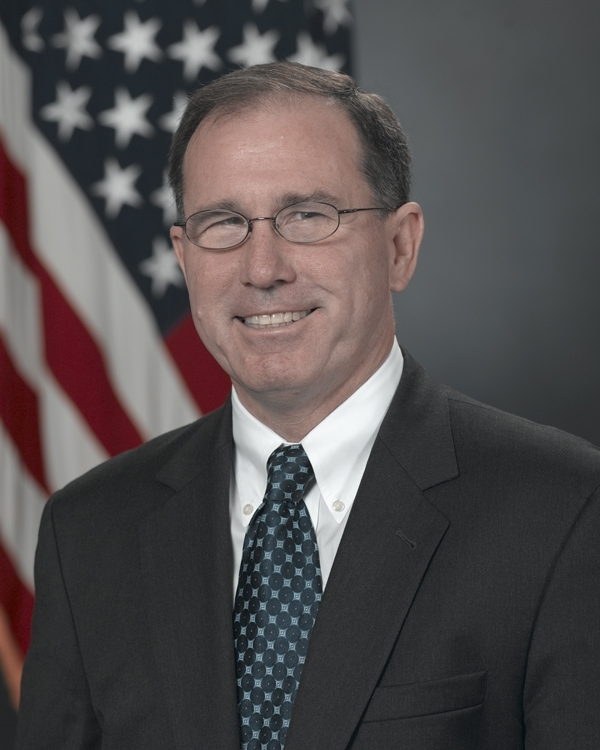

Under Secretary of Defense for Intelligence
- In office March 16, 2011 – April 30, 2015
- President: Barack Obama
- Preceded by: Jim Clapper
- Succeeded by: Marcel Lettre

Assistant Secretary of Defense for Special Operations and Low-Intensity Conflict
- In office July 23, 2007 – March 16, 2011
- President: George W. Bush; Barack Obama
- Preceded by: Thomas O'Connell
- Succeeded by: Michael A. Sheehan

Personal details
- Born: Michael George Vickers; April 27, 1953 (age 73) Burbank, California, U.S.
- Spouses: Phebe Novakovic (div.); Melana Zyla Vickers
- Children: 5
- Education: University of Alabama, Tuscaloosa (BA); University of Pennsylvania (MBA); Johns Hopkins University (PhD)

Military service
- Allegiance: United States
- Branch/service: United States Army
- Years of service: 1973–1983
- Rank: Captain
- Unit: 10th Special Forces Group; 7th Special Forces Group; Classified counterterrorism unit

Michael George Vickers (born April 27, 1953) is an American defense official who served as the Under Secretary of Defense for Intelligence (USD-I). As USD-I, Vickers, who was appointed by President Barack Obama in 2010, was the Defense Department's top civilian military intelligence official. Before becoming USD-I, Vickers served as Assistant Secretary of Defense for Special Operations and Low Intensity Conflict.

Prior to joining the Defense Department, Vickers served in the U.S. Army Special Forces as both a non-commissioned officer and commissioned officer, as well as a Central Intelligence Agency (CIA) paramilitary operations officer from the elite Special Activities Division. While in the CIA, he played a key role in the arming of the Islamic mujahideen against the communist government in the war against the Soviet invasion of Afghanistan. Some of the mujahideen groups armed by Vickers became the Taliban and Al-Queda/Afganistan while other parts became their opposition, the Northern Alliance.

== Early life ==
Vickers was born in Burbank, California, and attended Hollywood High School.

He has acknowledged earning C's in high school and scraping through junior college before finding purpose in the Army. Andrew F. Krepinevich Jr., a retired Army officer who taught Vickers at Johns Hopkins and later hired him at the Center for Strategic and Budgetary Assessments, described Vickers’ poor performance as a youth, "Sometimes gifted people get bored by the offerings mere mortals get."

Before he served in Special Forces, his original intention was to play professional football or baseball. He was beaten out of a starting position at Pierce College by future NCIS star Mark Harmon, who went on to play for UCLA.

His father, Richard, was a master carpenter working on movie sets for 20th Century Fox. He attributed this to his son's choice of career: "It was pretty easy to see it coming, he was interested in all that spy stuff." The younger Vickers would also say, "I had a spirit of adventure, and probably saw too many James Bond movies as a kid."

== Career ==
In June 1973, Vickers enlisted in the US Army under the Special Forces Enlistment Option. He completed the Airborne Course in December 1973, and the Special Forces Qualification Course in May 1974. He was assigned to 10th Special Forces Group (Airborne) at Fort Devens after graduating from SFQC, serving as a senior weapons sergeant from June 1974 to December 1976. While at 10th SFG, Vickers attended Ranger School, the German Army Advanced Mountain Climbing Course in Mittenwald, the Special Forces Engineer/Demolitions Course, and the Special Atomic Demolitions Course. He was a combatives instructor at the United States Military Academy, deployed on a Flintlock exercise, and was attached to Detachment A, Berlin Brigade where he received advanced urban unconventional warfare training. After completing Czech language training at the Defense Language Institute (DLI) in January 1978, Vickers was assigned to A Company, 1st Battalion, Special Forces Detachment Europe (Airborne). He completed the British Special Air Service Counterterrorism Close Battle Course in June 1978.

After attending Officer Candidate School, Vickers was commissioned in December 1978 and assigned to 3rd Battalion, 7th Special Forces Group (Airborne) at Fort Gulick in Panama. He graduated from the Infantry Officer Basic Course, where he earned the Expert Infantryman Badge, and the DLI's Spanish language course. Vickers graduated from the Special Forces Officer Course as a Distinguished Honor Graduate in April 1980 and completed the Military Free Fall Parachutist Course. He was promoted to captain in September 1982 and commanded a classified counterterrorism (CT) unit for two years in support of CONPLAN 0300, deploying to several Latin American countries, and was a planner for special-operations forces (SOF) contingency operations against the Sandinista regime in Nicaragua. In June 1983, Vickers left the Army to join the Central Intelligence Agency.

Vickers served in the Latin America Division, the International Activities Division (Special Operations Group) and the Near East and South Asia Division. He deployed to Grenada, established the CIA station and performed operational missions. For this, he received an award for heroism under fire from the Director of Central Intelligence. After the October 1983 Marine Barracks bombing, Vickers was selected for a special counter-terrorism assignment in Lebanon.

Vickers was selected as the program officer and chief strategist for the Afghanistan Covert Action Program in October 1984, coordinating an effort that involved ten countries and providing direction to forces made up of over 500,000 anti-Soviet fighters.

Later, Vickers was Senior Vice President, Strategic Studies, at the Center for Strategic and Budgetary Assessments (CSBA), during which he provided advice on Iraq strategy to US President George H. W. Bush and his war cabinet.

In 2004, he wrote an op-ed piece for USA Today in which he stated that the United States could be successful in Iraq by using a much smaller force modeled on its deployment in Afghanistan.

In July 2007, he was confirmed by the United States Senate as Assistant Secretary of Defense, where he was the senior civilian advisor to the US Secretary of Defense on such matters as "counter-terrorism" strategy and operational employment of special operations forces, strategic forces, and conventional forces. This role saw Vickers hunting many of the former anti-Soviet fighters that he assisted during the Afghan-Soviet war.

Regarding ISIS and Al-Qaeda, Vickers advocated a policy of disruption, raids intended to distract and keep militants off-balance such that they are unable to organize and execute action against the United States and its forces in Afghanistan, Iraq, and the Middle East.

He retired from government service in April 2015. As of December 2015, it was announced that he had been appointed to the BAE Systems board of directors.

In 2020, Vickers, along with over 130 other former Republican national security officials, signed a statement that asserted that President Trump was unfit to serve another term, and "To that end, we are firmly convinced that it is in the best interest of our nation that Vice President Joe Biden be elected as the next President of the United States, and we will vote for him."

In October 2020, Vickers signed a letter that stated the Biden laptop story "has the classic earmarks of a Russian information operation". In May 2023, The New York Times reported that no evidence has emerged the laptop contained Russian disinformation, and portions of its contents have been verified as authentic, prompting House Republicans to term the signers of the letter, including Vickers, as "spies who lie".

== Education ==
Vickers originally began attending the University of Alabama in 1980, and undertook additional remote coursework through Florida State University and the University of Oklahoma. He earned credits from nine universities and colleges before graduating cum laude from UA in 1983, writing his honors thesis on U.S. intelligence policy. Vickers went on to attend The Wharton School at the University of Pennsylvania from which he received an MBA. He earned a Ph.D. in 2011 in International Relations/Strategic Studies from the Paul H. Nitze School of Advanced International Studies (SAIS) at Johns Hopkins University under Professor Eliot A. Cohen.

== Personal life ==
Vickers was previously married to Phebe Novakovic, a former intelligence officer, General Dynamics CEO, and director at JP Morgan.

He later married Melana Zyla Vickers and has five daughters: Alexandra, Natasha, Sophia, Oksana and Kalyna.

== Publications ==
- Vickers, Michael G. (2023). By All Means Available: Memoirs of a Life in Intelligence, Special Operations, and Strategy. Alfred A. Knopf. ISBN 9781101947708.

== In popular culture ==
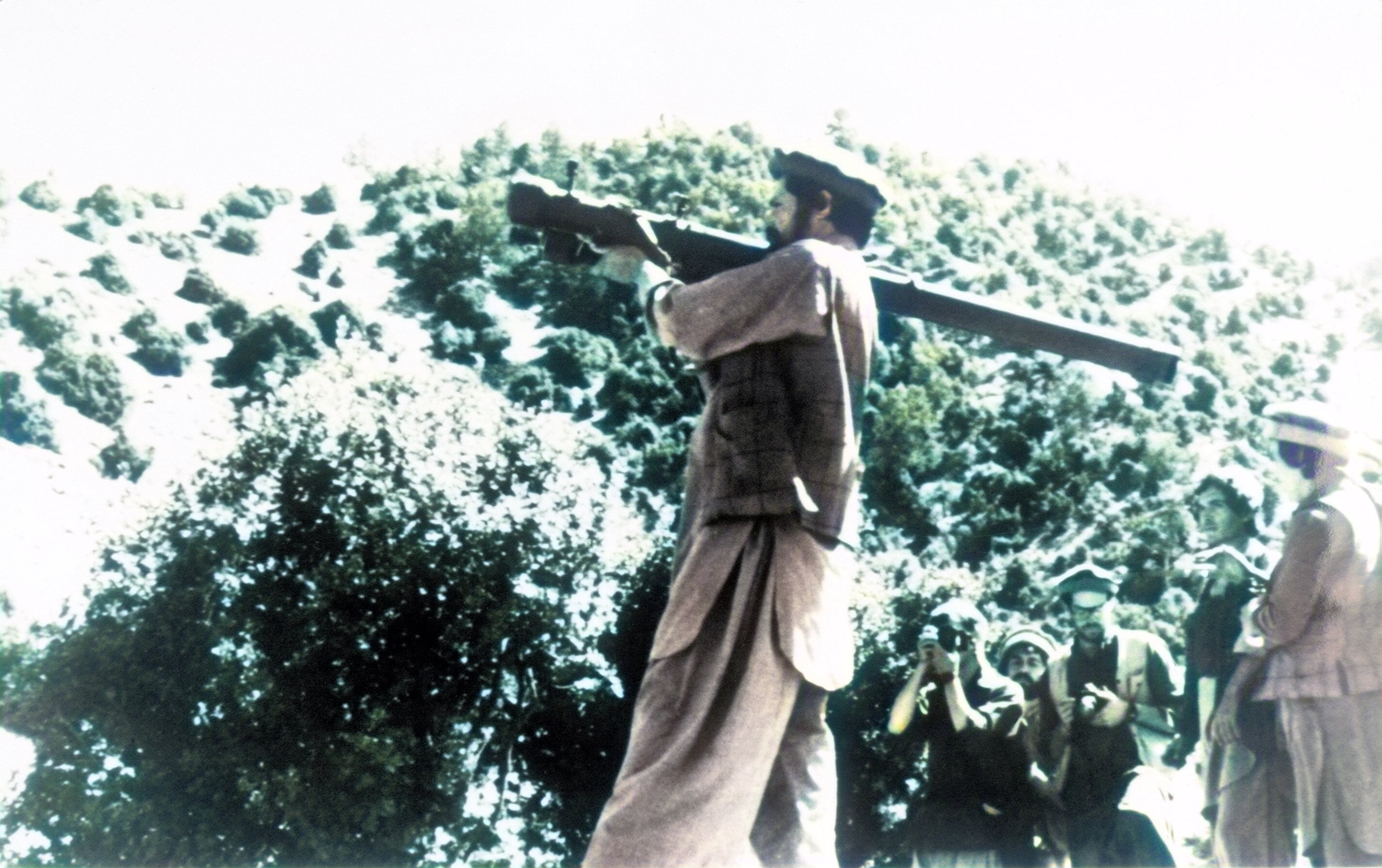
A mujahideen resistance fighter shoots an SA-7, 1988

Vickers' role at the Central Intelligence Agency during the Soviet–Afghan War was featured in George Crile's 2003 book Charlie Wilson's War, and in the 2007 movie adaptation in which he is played by actor Christopher Denham.

== See also ==
- Charlie Wilson (Texas politician)
- Gust Avrakotos
- Howard Hart

Political offices
Preceded by Thomas O'Connell	Assistant Secretary of Defense for Special Operations and Low-Intensity Conflict; 2007–2011	Succeeded by Michael D. Lumpkin; Acting
Preceded by James Clapper	Under Secretary of Defense for Intelligence; 2011–2015	Succeeded by Marcel Lettre
