= Joanne Herring =

American businesswoman, activist and diplomat

Joanne King Herring
- Born: Joanne Johnson; July 3, 1929 (age 97); Houston, Texas, U.S.
- Education: University of Texas at Austin (dropped out)
- Years active: 1950–2018
- Organization: Marshall Plan Charities
- Known for: Activism for the support against the Soviet influence in global politics Association with military government of President Zia-ul-Haq
- Title: The Dame; The Knight; Ambassador
- Spouses: Robert King 1948–1969; Robert Herring 1972–1986; Lloyd Davis 1986–2005
- Children: 5
- Awards: Jinnah Medal (1980s); International Women's Forum "Women Who Make a Difference" Award, 1987

Joanne King Herring (born July 3, 1929) is an American socialite, businesswoman, political activist, philanthropist, diplomat, and former television talk show host.

Originally from Houston, Texas, she is best known for influencing policy through her long association and political relationship with President of Pakistan Zia-ul-Haq 1924-1988 (1977–88). Herring also served as the honorary consul at the Consulate-General of Pakistan based in Houston; on special request and favor of Muhammad Zia-ul-Haq she is also the recipient of the Jinnah Medal, one of Pakistan's highest honors.

Throughout the 1980s, Herring lobbied for United States support for the Mujahideen in Afghanistan in collaboration with U.S. Representative Charlie Wilson. These events inspired the book Charlie Wilson's War: The Extraordinary Story of the Largest Covert Operation in History; Herring is portrayed by actress Julia Roberts in the 2007 film Charlie Wilson's War. Since the September 11 attacks, Herring has stated that she "did not make al-Qaeda" and that she "cannot predict the future." Herring's second book, Diplomacy and Diamonds: My Wars from the Ballroom to the Battlefield, was released on January 1, 2011.

== Life and work ==
Herring was born Joanne Johnson in Houston, the daughter of Maelan (McGill) and William Dunlap Johnson. Herring grew up in the city's affluent River Oaks neighborhood, and her childhood acquaintances included James A. Baker, III, who would serve as Secretary of State. She enrolled at the University of Texas at Austin, but left after her second year to marry real estate developer Robert King.

A fixture on the Houston social circuit, Herring became notorious for the lavish, decadent birthday party her husband threw for her in 1959. The "Roman orgy"-themed affair included period costumes and a mock slave auction, and was covered by Life magazine and various local news media. In the late 1950s, she began a 15-year-long hosting tenure for the eponymous daytime talk show The Joanne King Show on Houston's KHOU-TV station. By 1974, her show had moved to KPRC.

== Media appearances ==
Herring appears as herself in the comic 1999 documentary feature Five Wives, Three Secretaries and Me and the 1970s German television news series V.I.P.-Schaukel. In the former—the story of a Houston businessman who marries five times—Herring playfully introduces herself by saying, "Well, my name is Joanne Johnson King Herring Davis, and I've had almost as many husbands as he's had wives." Herring has also appeared on CNN with Ali Velshi multiple times to discuss continued American involvement in Afghanistan.

== Marshall Plan Charities ==
In 2009, Herring founded Marshall Plan Charities, which seeks to "complement the ongoing U.S. military effort in Afghanistan by rapidly and effectively redeveloping normal, healthy civilian life village by village". The organization unites the efforts of various NGOs concerned with the Afghan people in hopes of providing villages with clean water, food, healthcare, schools, and jobs.

== Involvement with Zia-ul-Haq ==
Herring is known for her long association and with president of Pakistan Zia-ul-Haq. Her contacts with Zia dated back to the early 1970s, when he, as a brigadier-general, was a contingent commander of Pakistani military formations in Jordan. In 1980, Zia convened and held a dinner in honor of Robert and Joanne Herring in Islamabad. About the military intelligence program run against the prime minister Zulfikar Bhutto, Herring reportedly defended Zia's action. She also wrote that [Zulfikar] Bhutto "was tried by his own judges and convicted of murder. The Koran serves as the unofficial constitution of Pakistan. It exacts an eye for an eye and a tooth for a tooth. If you murder, you must die. The only thing Zia did was to not commute Bhutto's sentence. In a country whose constitution demanded capital punishment for murder, Zia could not violate the Law."

In Charlie Wilson's War, George Crile III maintained that "Herring was said to have been a most trusted American adviser in President Zia's administration." It was Herring who acquainted Charlie Wilson with Zia who later secured major funding for Pakistan's anti-communist policies.

Over the years, Herring's influence on Zia and his military administration grew further, and Zia became so enamored with her that he would interrupt cabinet meetings to take her call. Said Foreign minister Yaqub Khan in his memoirs: "She absolutely had his ear, it was terrible!" Zia neglected protocols and dismayed the Foreign Office when he appointed her his honorary consul at the Houston-based Consulate-General of Pakistan. In a public ceremony held in Pakistan, Zia personally honored her with Pakistan's highest civilian honor, the Tamgha-e-Quaid-e-Azam (lit. Jinnah Medal). She paid tribute to Zia in her 2011 autobiography.

Husain Haqqani, former Pakistan Ambassador and former adviser to three Pakistani prime ministers, described Herring as "known more for glamour than for political wisdom", and Zia "showered her with hospitality to use her connections". Haqqani described her as knowing "little about the country," criticizing her for inaccurately describing Pakistan as an "Arab nation" in her memoirs.

== Awards ==
- Received the Freedom Foundation at Valley Forge Award in the 1960s
- Knighted by the King of Belgium in the 1970s
- Made roaming Ambassador of Pakistan in the 1980s, and received the Tamgha-e-Quaid-e-Azam, the highest honor given by the nation of Pakistan.
- International Women's Forum "Women Who Make a Difference" Award, 1987
- Made a Dame in the Royal Order of Francis I in 2011
- Inducted into the Texas Women's Hall of Fame in 2014

== See also ==
- Cynthia D. Ritchie
- General Rani
- Inter-Services Intelligence
