= Phebe Novakovic =

American businesswoman and former intelligence officer

Phebe Nevenka Novakovic
- Born: November 1957 (age 68)
- Education: Smith College (BA); University of Pennsylvania (MBA)
- Occupation: CEO of General Dynamics
- Spouses: Michael G. Vickers (m. 1985, divorced); David Morrison
- Children: 3

Phebe Novakovic (born 1957) is an American businesswoman and former intelligence officer. She has been the chairwoman and chief executive officer of General Dynamics since 2013.

== Early and personal life ==
Novakovic is of Serbian descent. She graduated from Smith College in Northampton, Massachusetts in 1979 and received an MBA from the Wharton School of the University of Pennsylvania in Philadelphia in 1988. She was previously married to Michael G. Vickers, former Under Secretary of Defense for Intelligence and Security, Special Forces soldier, and CIA paramilitary officer. She has three daughters.

== Career ==
From 1997 to 2001, Novakovic worked for the United States Department of Defense and the Central Intelligence Agency.

In 2001, following her departure from the Defense Department she joined General Dynamics. She rose to president and chief operations officer in 2012 and chairman and chief executive officer in January 2013.

== Board memberships ==
Novakovic has been on the board of directors of Abbott Laboratories since 2010, and of J. P. Morgan Chase since 2020. Additionally, she sits on the boards for the Congressional Medal of Honor Foundation and the National Military Family Association. She is a member of the Board of Trustees for Northwestern University.

== Recognition ==
In 2018, Novakovic was listed as the 25th most powerful woman in the world by Forbes.

She was ranked 21st on Fortune's list of Most Powerful Women in 2023. That same year, she was named as the world's 29th most powerful woman by Forbes.
