= Cynthia D. Ritchie =

American filmmaker, analyst and social media campaigner

- Occupations: Writer, Filmmaker

Cynthia D. Ritchie is an American filmmaker, analyst, and social media campaigner who has been living in Pakistan since 2010. Ritchie has campaigned through social media to uplift the overall image of Pakistan.

In June 2020, Ritchie made allegations of sexual misconduct against Rehman Malik, a Pakistani politician belonging to the Pakistan Peoples Party.

== Background ==
Ritchie graduated from Louisiana State University with a Master's degree in education and has additional graduate-level training at the University of Houston's School of Law, Pepperdine University, and George Washington University in mass communication, criminal justice, conflict resolution, clinical and behavioral psychology, as well as strategic public relations.

She has been described as a global citizen and has written on topics including interfaith harmony, women's and children's rights, tourism, and strong Pakistan–United States relations.

== In Pakistan ==
In July 2020, the Interior Ministry of Pakistan announced before Islamabad High Court that Ritchie was allowed to work and had been given clearances and travel assistance for film projects by Inter-Services Public Relations and the regional Government of Khyber Pakhtunkhwa.

Ritchie's first-known visit to Pakistan was in 2010, after she acquired a visit visa from Pakistan's Houston consulate through Federal Minister for Narcotics Control Azam Khan Swati, who with other Houston-based Pakistanis reportedly helped Ritchie via socializing with elite political contacts. According to Baqir Sajjad Syed, Ritchie worked in Pakistan for the Omair-Sana Foundation and Humanity Hope, institutions which are owned or managed by US-based Pakistani doctors. Ritchie also worked to improve communications in Pakistan's health sector.

In 2013, Michael Kugelman from the Woodrow Wilson Institute in Washington, D.C. described Ritchie as one of "[t]en Americans doing great things for Pakistan".

From about 2015, Ritchie began to actively promote tourism to Pakistan over broadcast and social media.

Around 2016–2020, Ritchie began to research and analyse the Afghan-Pakistan Tribal region, fifth-generation warfare, Kashmir conflicts, and Pakistan–India relations. Several academic researchers noticed Ritchie attending policing and security conferences about Pakistan and regional conflicts during the mid-2010's.

In her media engagements, Ritchie said she did not choose Pakistan as an interest and that Pakistanis chose her to alter international perceptions about Pakistan. She has been called "The American Batting For Pakistan".

Some of Ritchie's critics have written: according to barrister Awais Baba, she " ... has become a celebrity in Pakistan over the last few years, and a star during the last week or so. And why wouldn't she? She is tall, pretty, and single, and a stunningly brilliant communicator. Her utterances have sensationalized the politics of Pakistan ....". According to The Guardian, "Ritchie has a supremely confident manner, and speaks as if she already knows that you're going to agree with her ... What comes across from speaking to her is a sense of mission – that it is not only incumbent on her personally, but within her power, to change Pakistan's internal culture and its standing in the world."

In 2017, Ritchie appeared in the docudrama Angels Within.

== Rape allegations and counter claims ==
In June 2020, Ritchie accused the leadership of Pakistan People's Party (PPP) of sexual misconduct over social media in 2011. Political leaders contested the claims; when she was asked why she had not reported the rape incident earlier, she replied that several days after the event she reported the rape by the then-Interior Minister Rehman Malik and theft of her laptop to a US embassy official. In 2012, Ritchie also reported the theft of her identity to federal authorities in Washington, D.C.; according to her, the "[US] Embassy's response and the USG's response was inadequate" and "besides, who in the [then] PPP administration would help me?" She stated she was in the wrong place at the wrong time and knew too much about US–Pakistan relations, especially about events leading to May 1, 2011, and became a political liability, which she said was the reason for the lack of adequate assistance for an American in distress. Ritchie worked for the health ministry, which collected samples from Abbottabad. She started visiting the region two years prior to the Osama bin Laden raid, and said her presence in the Federal health ministry at the time was "a coincidence".

After Ritchie's allegations were made public, PPP and Senator Rehman Malik, Chairman of the Senate Standing Committee on Interior, moved to place Ritchie on the Exit Control List (ECL), leveled criminal charges against her, used their influence to have her diplomat fiancé recalled to his home country, froze her bank accounts, and moved to have Ritchie deported. Ritchie replied she was not intimidated by the PPP's threats of rape, kidnap and blackmail to her and her loved ones, that she was not going anywhere and was prepared to face the matters in court.

On August 5, 2020, a lower court dismissed Ritchie's rape case against Malik and Malik's defamation case against her. Ritchie stated she was prepared to take her case to Pakistan's Supreme Court if needed and contacted Congressional representatives about the court cases. A few weeks later, the Islamabad High Court (IHC) issued notices in a petition by Ritchie seeking registration of a rape case against Malik. In Ritchie's petition, her counsel Imran Feroze stated "the petition was dismissed by the additional district and sessions (ADS) judge illegally and unlawfully".

On the September 1, 2020, the Islamabad High Court accepted Ritchie's petition against Malik and sent her case back to the lower court for further hearing. A few days later, the Ministry of Interior denied Ritchie's visa extension without explanation and was unable to clarify its stance on visa policies and laws before the Chief Justice in the IHC. On 7 September 2020, the IHC issued a court stay order for Ritchie to remain in the country.

On 11 September, PPP senator Malik petitioned the IHC to stop the hearing of Ritchie's petition for registration of a case against him by the additional district and sessions judge. Malik also filed a separate petition against Ritchie in the IHC. On the same day, Ritchie's lawyer Saiful Muluk filed his power of attorney in the IHC to represent her. Ritchie said she had lodged a complaint with the US embassy a few days after the alleged incident, due to her being on lockdown orders from the Interior Minister, which said she should remain in her quarters for safety because Americans were targets after the Bin Laden raid. She said the FBI had been informed about Malik. Ritchie said she had not been employed as or worked as a consultant with any Pakistani government organisation, including Inter-Services Public Relations (ISPR), but that she had only received her clearances and permissions to travel and conduct film work in remote and sensitive locations. She said impartial investigations must take place into the motorway gang rape incident, that rapists should be punished to the fullest extent of the law, and the law-enforcement agencies must work together to ensure vulnerable populations' safety.

On 14 September 2020, the IHC dismissed Malik's application to stop the proceedings on Ritchie's plea in the subordinate court. The IHC noted the subordinate court would decide the case without interference from the high court.

On 29 September, the Pakistani Supreme Court issued notices to the Advocate General (AG) and Prosecutor General (PG) of Islamabad in Malik's case against Ritchie. A three-member bench headed by Justice Mushir Alam and composed of Justices Yahya Afridi and Qazi Muhammad Amin Ahmed, heard the case. The PG noted Ritchie's cases had merit and that she maintained good standing within Pakistan. Advocate Sardar Latif Khosa, counsel for Rehman Malik, asked the court to quash the IHC's decision regarding the investigation and registration of the first information report (FIR) into Malik. Malik requested immunity from prosecution, but was denied immunity by the Supreme Court. The court issued notices and adjourned the hearing of the case until 30 September, where Mailk's attempt to quash Ritchie's request for registration of FIR against Malik were denied him.

On his Twitter account on 4 October 2020, Malik said he would drop all charges and cases against Ritchie but failed to do so at that time. In January 2021, Malik and Ritchie both withdrew legal petitions against each other, reaching an out-of-court agreement.

== Controversy ==
As well as her allegations against former Interior Minister Rehman Malik, Ritchie has also alleged on Twitter sexual misconduct by other Pakistani politicians. Ritchie's sympathizers called #MeToo activists "hypocrites" for not expressing "unequivocal support" for her. Some Aurat (women) marchers accused Ritchie of having "white privilege".

The Pakistan People's Party did not come to Ritchie's assistance and its chairman did not "take any notice nor rush to stand by [her] for a greater cause ... instead moving the Ministry of Interior to investigate her – the first incident for Ritchie in over 10+ years in the country". The PPP lodged complaints of false allegations against Ritchie, who countered with more accusations through her Twitter account. A social-media war broke out and the PPP erroneously accused Ritchie of online defamation of a deceased Prime Minister. Both the Pakistan Telecom Authority and Federal Investigation Agency cyber-crime division said Ritchie committed no criminal offence and they would not pursue a case against her. The PPP then issued a series of First Information Reports (FIRs) against Ritchie and approached the Islamabad High Court to have her deported due to her political statements on Twitter. The High Court stated there was no Pakistani law forbidding foreigners from making political statements and ordered the Ministry of Interior (MoI) to let the law take its course and handle the matter itself. After seeming to confuse work and visa policies, the Ministry of Interior acknowledged that it violated its own visa policy, but gave the blogger a clean chit on July 17, 2020.

== See also ==
- Aurat March
- Ayesha Gulalai Wazir
- Joanne Herring
- Politics of Pakistan
- Women in Pakistan
