= Charlie Wilson's War (film) =

- Theatrical release poster
- Directed by: Mike Nichols
- Screenplay by: Aaron Sorkin
- Based on: Charlie Wilson's War: The Extraordinary Story of the Largest Covert Operation in History by George Crile
- Produced by: Tom Hanks; Gary Goetzman
- Starring: Tom Hanks; Philip Seymour Hoffman; Julia Roberts; Amy Adams; Ned Beatty
- Cinematography: Stephen Goldblatt
- Edited by: John Bloom; Antonia Van Drimmelen
- Music by: James Newton Howard
- Production companies: Relativity Media; Participant Productions; Playtone
- Distributed by: Universal Pictures
- Release date: December 21, 2007
- Running time: 100 minutes
- Country: United States
- Language: English
- Budget: $75 million
- Box office: $119.5 million

Charlie Wilson's War is a 2007 American biographical comedy-drama film based on the story of U.S. Congressman Charlie Wilson and CIA operative Gust Avrakotos, whose efforts led to Operation Cyclone, a program to organize and support the Afghan mujahideen during the Soviet–Afghan War (1979–89).

The film was directed by Mike Nichols (his final film) and written by Aaron Sorkin, who adapted George Crile III's 2003 book Charlie Wilson's War: The Extraordinary Story of the Largest Covert Operation in History. It stars Tom Hanks, Julia Roberts, and Philip Seymour Hoffman, with Amy Adams and Ned Beatty in supporting roles. It was released by Universal Pictures on December 21, 2007 and received generally positive reviews, with praise for the performances (particularly Hoffman's), and grossed $119.5 million on a $75 million budget. It earned five nominations at the 65th Golden Globe Awards, including Best Motion Picture – Musical or Comedy, and Hoffman earned a Best Supporting Actor nomination at the 80th Academy Awards.

== Plot ==
In 1980, Congressman Charlie Wilson, an East Texas Democrat, is more interested in partying than legislating, frequently throwing huge galas and staffing his congressional office with attractive young women. His social life eventually brings about a federal investigation into allegations of his cocaine use, conducted by federal prosecutor Rudy Giuliani as part of a larger investigation into congressional misconduct. The investigation results in no charge against Wilson.

A friend and romantic interest, Joanne Herring, Houston socialite, political activist, diplomat, and television talk show host, encourages Charlie to do more to help the Afghan people, and persuades him to visit the Pakistani leadership. The Pakistanis complain about the inadequate support of the U.S. to oppose the Soviet Union, and they insist that Wilson visit a major Pakistan-based Afghan refugee camp. The Congressman is deeply moved by their misery and determination to fight, but is frustrated by the regional CIA personnel's insistence on a low-key approach against the Soviet occupation of Afghanistan. Wilson returns home to lead an effort to substantially increase funding to the mujahideen.

As part of this effort, Charlie befriends maverick CIA operative Gust Avrakotos and his understaffed Afghanistan group to find a better strategy, especially including a means to counter the Soviets' formidable Mil Mi-24 Hind helicopter gunship. This group was composed in part of members of the CIA's Special Activities Division, including a young paramilitary officer named Michael Vickers. As a result, Charlie's deft political bargaining for the necessary funding and Avrakotos' careful planning using those resources, such as supplying the guerrillas with FIM-92 Stinger missile launchers, turns the Soviet occupation into a deadly quagmire with their heavy fighting vehicles being destroyed at a crippling rate. Charlie enlists the support of Israel and Egypt for Soviet weapons and consumables, and Pakistan for distribution of arms. The CIA's anti-communism budget evolves from $5 million to over $500 million (with the same amount matched by Saudi Arabia), startling several congressmen. This effort by Charlie ultimately evolves into a major portion of the U.S. foreign policy known as the Reagan Doctrine, under which the U.S. expanded assistance beyond just the mujahideen and began also supporting other anti-communist resistance movements around the world. Charlie states that senior Pentagon official Michael Pillsbury persuaded President Ronald Reagan to provide the Stingers to the Afghans.

Gust vehemently advises Charlie to seek support for post-Soviet occupation Afghanistan, referencing the "zen master's" story of the lost horse. He also emphasizes that rehabilitating schools in the country will help educate young children before they are influenced by the "crazies". Charlie attempts to appeal this with the government but finds no enthusiasm for even the modest measures he proposes. In the end, Charlie receives a major commendation for his support of the U.S. clandestine services, but his pride is tempered by his fears of the blowback his secret efforts could yield in the future and the implications of U.S. disengagement from Afghanistan.

== Cast ==
- Tom Hanks as Representative Charlie Wilson
- Philip Seymour Hoffman as Gust Avrakotos
- Julia Roberts as Joanne Herring
- Om Puri as Zia-ul-Haq, President of Pakistan
- Amy Adams as Bonnie Bach
- Ned Beatty as Representative Doc Long
- Emily Blunt as Jane Liddle
- Ken Stott as Israeli arms merchant Zvi Rafiah
- John Slattery as CIA director of European operations Henry Cravely
- Denis O'Hare as CIA station chief Harold Holt
- Jud Tylor as the aspiring starlet Crystal Lee
- Peter Gerety as Larry Liddle
- Shiri Appleby as Jailbait
- Brian Markinson as Crystal Lee's agent, Paul Brown
- Rachel Nichols as Suzanne
- Christopher Denham as Michael G. Vickers
- Faran Tahir as Brigadier Rashid
- Rizwan Manji as Colonel Mahmood
- Michael Spellman as CIA Agent Patrick
- Spencer Garrett as congressional committee staffer
- Kevin Cooney as congressional committee staffer
- Aharon Ipalé as the Egyptian Defense Minister
- Pasha Lychnikoff as Russian helicopter pilot
- Cyia Batten as Stacey
- Tracy Phillips as Carol Shannon, bellydancer
- Navid Negahban as refugee camp translator
- Wynn Everett as receptionist
- Fahim Fazli as villager (uncredited)
- Shaun Toub as Hassan (uncredited)

== Reception ==
=== Box office ===
The film was originally set for release on December 25, 2007; but on November 30, the timetable was moved up to December 21. In its opening weekend, the film grossed $9.6 million in 2,575 theaters in the United States and Canada, ranking No. 4 at the box office. It grossed a total of $119 million worldwide—$66.7 million in the United States and Canada and $52.3 million in other territories.

=== Critical response ===
On review aggregator Rotten Tomatoes, the film has an approval rating of 82% based on 203 reviews, with an average rating of 7.20/10. The site's critical consensus reads, "Charlie Wilson's War manages to entertain and inform audiences, thanks to its witty script and talented cast of power players." Metacritic reported the film had an average score of 67 out of 100, based on 39 critics, indicating "generally favorable" reviews. Audiences polled by CinemaScore gave the film an average grade of "A−" on an A+ to F scale.

=== Response ===
==== US Government ====
Some Reagan Era officials, including former Under Secretary of Defense Fred Ikle, have criticized some elements of the film. The Washington Times reported claims that the film wrongly promotes the notion that the CIA-led operation funded Osama bin Laden and ultimately produced the September 11 attacks; however, other Reagan-era officials have been more supportive of the film. Michael Johns, the former foreign policy analyst at The Heritage Foundation and White House speechwriter to President George H. W. Bush, praised the film as "the first mass-appeal effort to reflect the most important lesson of America's Cold War victory: that the Reagan-led effort to support freedom fighters resisting Soviet oppression led successfully to the first major military defeat of the Soviet Union... Sending the Red Army packing from Afghanistan proved one of the single most important contributing factors in one of history's most profoundly positive and important developments."

==== Russia ====
In February 2008, it was revealed that the film would not be released in Russian theaters. The rights for the film were bought by Universal Pictures International (UPI) Russia. It was speculated that the film would not appear because of a certain point of view that depicted the Soviet Union unfavorably. UPI Russia head Yevgeny Beginin denied that, saying, "We simply decided that the film would not make a profit." Reaction from Russian bloggers was also negative. One wrote: "The whole film shows Russians, or rather Soviets, as brutal killers."

== Historical accuracy ==
=== Mujahideen support ===
While the film depicts Wilson as an immediate advocate for supplying the mujahideen with Stinger missiles, a former Reagan administration official recalls that he and Wilson, while advocates for the mujahideen, were actually initially "lukewarm" on the idea of supplying these missiles. Their opinion changed when they discovered that rebels were successfully downing Soviet gunships with them. As such, they were actually not supplied until 1987, during the second Reagan term, and their provision was advocated mostly by Reagan defense officials and influential conservatives.

=== Ending ===
According to Melissa Roddy, a Los Angeles filmmaker with inside information from the production, the film's happy ending where Wilson receives an award came about because Tom Hanks did not feel comfortable with an original draft, which ended on a scene featuring the September 11 attacks. Citing the original screenplay, which was very different from the final product, in Reel Power: Hollywood Cinema and American Supremacy Matthew Alford wrote that the film gave up "the chance to produce what at least had the potential to be the Dr. Strangelove of our generation".

=== Academic research ===
The film received a mixed reaction in terms of historical accuracy.

Charlie Wilson's War (2007) is amusing but has only an intermittent connection with historical reality.

— Rodric Braithwaite, Afgantsy (2011)

George Crile's magnificent book Charlie Wilson's War, and the movie that was made from it, is an excellent account, but it is told from the perspective of one Texas congressman and tends to distort his importance.

— Bruce Riedel, What We Won (2014)

George Crile's Charlie Wilson's War has been made into a film, and features the same degree of fantasy and escapism as Rambo III, which was also set in the Soviet-Afghan War.

— Robert Johnson, The Afghan Way of War (2012)

== Aftermath ==
The film depicts the concern expressed by Charlie and Gust that Afghanistan was being neglected in the 1990s, following the Soviet withdrawal. In one of the film's final scenes, Gust dampens Charlie's enthusiasm over the Soviet withdrawal from Afghanistan, saying "I'm about to give you an NIE (National Intelligence Estimate) that shows the crazies are rolling into Kandahar." As he says this, the sound of jet airliners soar overhead, a premonition of the coming 9/11 attacks.

George Crile III, author of the book on which the film is based, wrote that the mujahideen's victory in Afghanistan ultimately opened a power vacuum for bin Laden:

By the end of 1993, in Afghanistan itself there were no roads, no schools, just a destroyed country—and the United States was washing its hands of any responsibility. It was in this vacuum that the Taliban and Osama bin Laden would emerge as the dominant players. It is ironic that a man who had almost nothing to do with the victory over the Red Army, Osama bin Laden, would come to personify the power of the jihad.

In 2008, Canadian journalist Arthur Kent sued the makers of the film, claiming that they had used material he produced in the 1980s without obtaining the proper authorization. On September 19, 2008, Kent announced that he had reached a settlement with the film's producers and distributors, and that he was "very pleased" with the terms of the settlement, which remain confidential.

== Accolades ==
Award	Date of ceremony	Category	Nominee(s)	Result	Ref.
Academy Awards	February 24, 2008	Best Supporting Actor	Philip Seymour Hoffman	Nominated	
British Academy Film Awards	February 10, 2008	Best Actor in a Supporting Role	Philip Seymour Hoffman	Nominated	
Chicago Film Critics Association	December 13, 2007	Best Supporting Actor	Philip Seymour Hoffman	Nominated	
Critics' Choice Movie Awards	January 7, 2008	Best Supporting Actor	Philip Seymour Hoffman	Nominated	
Critics' Choice Movie Awards	January 7, 2008	Best Writer	Aaron Sorkin	Nominated	
Dallas-Fort Worth Film Critics Association	December 17, 2007	Best Supporting Actor	Philip Seymour Hoffman	2nd Place	
Dallas-Fort Worth Film Critics Association	December 17, 2007	Top 10 Films		10th Place	
Golden Globe Awards	January 13, 2008	Best Motion Picture – Musical or Comedy		Nominated	
Golden Globe Awards	January 13, 2008	Best Actor – Motion Picture Musical or Comedy	Tom Hanks	Nominated	
Golden Globe Awards	January 13, 2008	Best Supporting Actor – Motion Picture	Philip Seymour Hoffman	Nominated	
Golden Globe Awards	January 13, 2008	Best Supporting Actress – Motion Picture	Julia Roberts	Nominated	
Golden Globe Awards	January 13, 2008	Best Screenplay	Aaron Sorkin	Nominated	
National Society of Film Critics	January 5, 2008	Best Supporting Actor	Philip Seymour Hoffman	3rd Place	
Online Film Critics Society	January 8, 2008	Best Supporting Actor	Philip Seymour Hoffman	Nominated	
Sant Jordi Awards	April 23, 2009	Best Foreign Actor (also for Before the Devil Knows You're Dead and The Savages)	Philip Seymour Hoffman	Won	
Toronto Film Critics Association	December 18, 2007	Best Supporting Actor	Philip Seymour Hoffman	Nominated	
Washington D.C. Area Film Critics Association	December 10, 2007	Best Adapted Screenplay	Aaron Sorkin	Won	
World Soundtrack Academy	October 18, 2008	Soundtrack Composer of the Year (also for Michael Clayton and I Am Legend)	James Newton Howard	Won	

== Home media ==
The film was released on DVD on April 22, 2008. Universal announced a combined release with both HD DVD and DVD discs in early 2008, but it was left unreleased when the company ended support for the format in favor of Blu-ray.
