= Gust Avrakotos =

American intelligence officer (1938–2005)

- Born: January 14, 1938; Aliquippa, Pennsylvania, U.S.
- Died: December 1, 2005 (aged 67); Inova Fairfax Hospital, Fairfax, Virginia, U.S.
- Resting place: St. Katherine's Greek Orthodox Church, Falls Church, Virginia, U.S.
- Education: Carnegie Institute of Technology; University of Pittsburgh
- Occupations: Case officer, Task Force Chief
- Employer: Central Intelligence Agency
- Spouse(s): Judith Driesen (before 1978) Claudette Avrakotos (m. 1986)
- Children: 1
- Awards: Intelligence Medal of Merit (1988)

Gust Lascaris Avrakotos (January 14, 1938 – December 1, 2005) was an American case officer and the Afghanistan Task Force Chief at the Central Intelligence Agency.

Avrakotos joined the CIA in August 1962 and was posted to Greece in 1963. Following the 1967 Greek coup d'état and the establishment of a far-right military junta, Avrakotos became the main liaison point for the CIA and Greek government. He worked closely with the regime until 1978, when he returned to a U.S. posting. He worked on the CIA's Near East desk, which included oversight of the agency's work in Afghanistan. The following year he became acting Chief of the South Asia Operations Group, which included involvement in Operation Cyclone, the CIA program to arm and finance the Afghan mujahideen in their war against the Soviets. He acquired arms and ammunition from numerous sources, and worked with U.S. Representative Charlie Wilson to build a coalition of international supporters to fund, arm and train the mujahideen.

Avrakotos resigned from the CIA in 1989 after being moved to the CIA's Africa Division, and authoring a memorandum opposing the CIA's involvement in the Iran-Contra Affair. After working for defense contractor TRW Inc. and then News Corporation, he returned to the CIA as a contractor between 1997 and 2003.

Avrakotos was little known to the public until 2003, when journalist George Crile published Charlie Wilson's War: The Extraordinary Story of the Largest Covert Operation in History, a history of U.S. involvement in the Soviet–Afghan War. The book was the basis of the film Charlie Wilson's War, released in 2007, in which Avrakotos is portrayed by Philip Seymour Hoffman. According to contemporaries, he was often referred to by his nickname "Dr. Dirty" for his willingness to ignore ethical considerations.

== Early life and education ==
Avrakotos was born on January 14, 1938, in Aliquippa, Pennsylvania, the son of Oscar, a Greek American soft drink manufacturer from the island of Lemnos, and his wife Zafira. The couple also had a daughter. He attended Aliquippa High School, where he graduated in 1955 as valedictorian. He then attended college at the Carnegie Institute of Technology (CIT); he briefly worked at Jones and Laughlin Steel mill in Aliquippa to earn money for his studies but left CIT after two years because of a strain on family finances. (Note: Both the Coca-Cola Company and PepsiCo had cut prices of their products in the area and Oscar was forced to close his business; Gust began working to pay off residual debts from the business.)

After working selling beer and cigarettes to bars frequented by immigrants from eastern and central Europe, Avrakotos had finished paying off the family debts by 1959. He returned to college at the University of Pittsburgh, where he graduated summa cum laude. (Note: His degree was either in economics or mathematics.)

== Career ==
After graduating from the University of Pittsburgh, Avrakotos interviewed for a position at IBM when one of his professors, Richard Cottam, who had also worked at the Central Intelligence Agency, suggested he meet with a CIA interviewer. Although the salary was only a third of what he could have earned at IBM, Avrakotos joined the CIA on August 1, 1962.

Avrakotos initially felt like an outsider at the CIA, which was heavily reliant on White Anglo-Saxon Protestants from Ivy League universities. The working class Avrakotos was one of the CIA's first White ethnic agents. He later said: "Almost everyone was a fucking blue blood in the CIA in 1961 when I came in. They were just beginning to let Jews move up that year. But there still weren't any blacks, Hispanics, or females—just some token Greeks and Polacks." Although he developed friendships with some of the officers in the organization, "he came to loathe a certain type of blue blood with a rage that bordered on class hatred", according to journalist George Crile. Throughout his time with the CIA, his blunt approach and use of obscenities in day-to-day speech irritated many of his superiors.

=== Posting in Greece ===
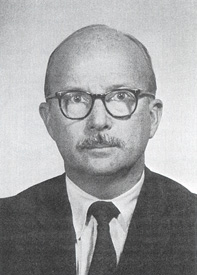
Richard Welch, chief of the CIA station in Athens was assassinated in December 1975.

After extensive training for field work, Avrakotos was posted to Greece in 1963. He spent time building relationships in Greek society, including within the military. Following the 1967 Greek coup d'état and the establishment of a far-right military junta, Avrakotos became the main liaison point for the CIA and the regime. He had built strong links with the members of the junta; Crile wrote that the colonels:

had all started off life as peasants before joining the army, and they felt a kinship with this charismatic, working-class American whose parents had come from Lemnos. They could speak Greek with him. He drank and whored with them, and they knew from the heart that he shared their ferocious anti-Communism.

Avrakotos lunched with the colonels regularly and socialized with them in the evenings and on weekends. He also provided both officially sanctioned advice, and more practical suggestions that had no official backing: when Andreas Papandreou, the future prime minister of Greece, was incarcerated, Avrakotos gave them the official message that Papandreou should be allowed to leave the country for the US, and also unofficially advised them to "shoot the motherfucker because he's going to come back to haunt you".

In December 1975, the CIA chief of station in Athens – and Avrakotos's superior – Richard Welch, was gunned down on his doorstep by three members of the 17 November Group, a far-left urban guerrilla terrorist organization after his cover as a member of the CIA was publicized. Two months later Avrakotos's cover was also blown, and he was pilloried in the Greek far-left press. With the publicity, his life also came under threat. Several of his friends from the regime of the Colonels were assassinated and Avrakotos had to increase the use of his fieldcraft to ensure he avoided being targeted. Nonetheless, he stayed on until his tenure in Greece was terminated in 1978.

=== Return to the U.S. ===
On his return to the U.S., Avrakotos was posted to Boston where he was to recruit visiting foreign businessmen—something he excelled at, according to Crile. Two of the Iranian businessmen he recruited provided real-time information to the CIA on security changes at the Embassy of the United States, Tehran during Operation Eagle Claw.

With the Soviet Union's invasion of Afghanistan in December 1979, Avrakotos saw an opportunity for the war to become the Soviet version of America's Vietnam War. He had his assistant, John Terjelian, write a report outlining the possibility of such an outcome. After three years working in Boston, he was relocated to the agency's headquarters in Langley, Virginia, from where he was sent on various assignments. Some members of staff gave him the nickname Dr. Dirty because the missions he would undertake were sensitive and difficult. He was concerned that he had been typecast in the position of an officer who undertakes such dirty work, and was delighted to be assigned as station chief in Helsinki, Finland. He undertook a Finnish-language course in preparation for his role, but before he could be posted, a change in the CIA hierarchy led to the posting being canceled because Avrakotos was considered too unpolished.

In September 1981, he was told of this decision by William Graver, the head of the European Division. Avrakotos told his superior to go and fuck himself, and walked out of the meeting. When later summoned to Graver's office to apologize, Avrakotos repeated the insult and again walked out. To avoid dismissal or censure, Avrakotos had a friend in the Latin American division find a job for him, still working at Langley, then avoided all areas of the building where he was likely to meet any of the superiors who would have started disciplinary proceedings.

=== South Asia Operations Group ===
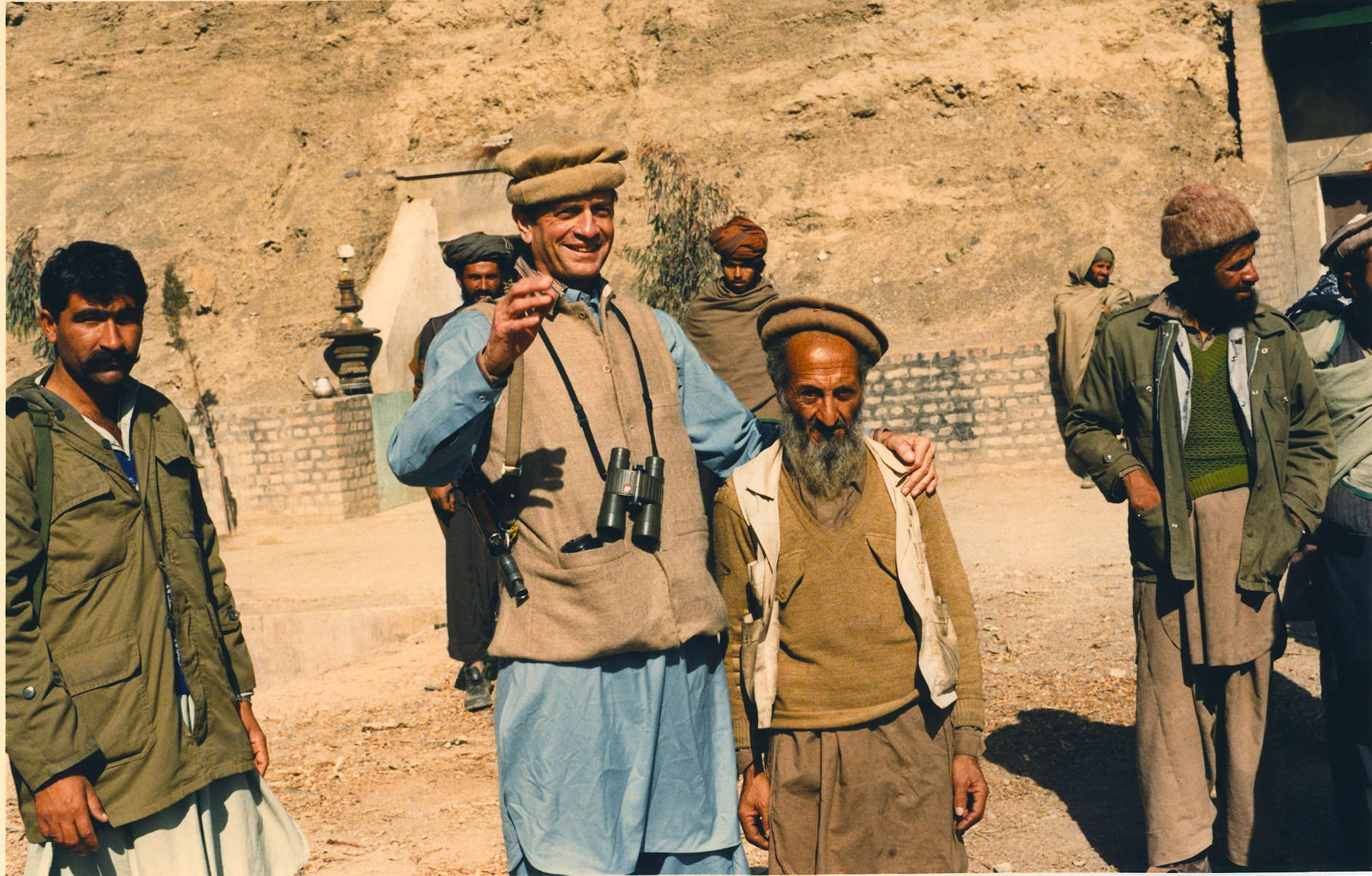
Charlie Wilson meeting with a member of the mujahideen while visiting Afghanistan

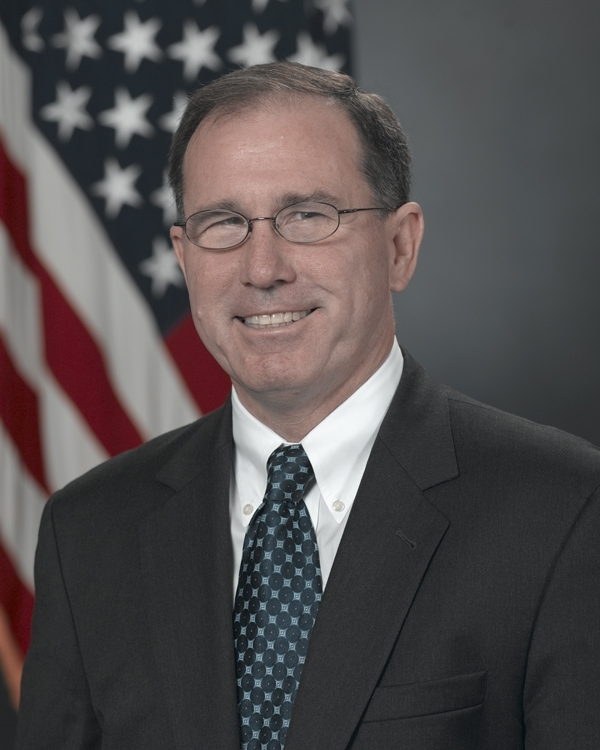
Michael G. Vickers in 2008

The position in the Latin America division was only temporary and in late 1982, Avrakotos soon found a position with the agency's Near East desk, which included oversight of the CIA's work in Afghanistan, including involvement in Operation Cyclone, the CIA program to arm and finance the Afghan mujahideen. In 1983, he was appointed acting Chief of the South Asia Operations Group. His early work in the group involved sourcing weapons and ammunition for the mujahideen, initially .303 rounds for the 100,000 First World War-era Lee–Enfield rifles. He was sent to the United Kingdom to procure the ammunition, and also assisted in Britain's covert operations to the mujahideen, providing MI6 with the money and equipment they needed.

He traveled to Egypt to obtain bicycles and wheelbarrows that were rigged as bombs and purchased sniper rifles; although it was illegal for him, as a member of the CIA, to sell these to foreigners, he reclassified them as "individual defensive devices ... long-range, night-vision devices with scopes". He also advised US Special Forces instructors training the mujahideen to use irregular warfare methods against the Soviets, telling the trainers: "Teach the mujahideen how to kill: pipe bombs, car bombs. But don't ever tell me how you’re doing it in writing. Just do it."

In 1983, Congressional funding to the CIA for use in Afghanistan was $15 million. That year, Texas representative Charlie Wilson persuaded the Appropriations Committee to provide an additional $40 million for CIA activity in the country; $17 million was specifically earmarked for anti-helicopter weapons. In early 1984, Avrakotos met with Wilson and—against CIA regulations—asked for an additional $50 million to aid the mujahideen. Wilson ensured the money was made available. (Note: $50 million in 1983 equates to approximately $161,627,130 in 2025, according to calculations based on United States Consumer Price Index measure of inflation.)

In 1984, Avrakotos appointed Michael G. Vickers from the CIA's paramilitary group to Operation Cyclone to revamp the strategy for the mujahideen. Vickers urged them to drop the Lee-Enfield in favor of a mix of weapons like the AK-47 and 14.5mm heavy machine guns, and to introduce new tactics, training, and logistics. Funding for Operation Cyclone rose year-on-year and by 1985, $250 million was provided to the CIA. This amount was half their operational budget. (Note: $250 million in 1985 equates to approximately $748,375,619 in 2025, according to calculations based on United States Consumer Price Index measure of inflation.) That year the operation received a big boost, after a $300 million Navy program was canceled and the funds were transferred to the CIA operation. (Note: $300 million in 1985 equates to approximately $898,050,743 in 2025, according to calculations based on United States Consumer Price Index measure of inflation.)

Since the late 1970s, the CIA had been sending the weapons for the mujahedeen through the Pakistan Inter Services Intelligence. During the 1980s, Avrakotos aided Wilson in persuading officials from Egypt, Israel and Saudi Arabia to increase support and funding for the operation; the Saudis pledged to secretly match all CIA spending toward the mujahedeen. Nations including the UK, Egypt, China and Israel provided weapons to fight the Soviets. Crile observes the international situation was unique: Pakistan provided training facilities, arms and advisors; Saudi Arabia and the US provided hundreds of millions of dollars, the UK, Egypt, China and Israel provided weapons; support of differing types came from numerous Muslim countries and the intelligence services of the UK, France, Canada, Germany, Singapore and others gave support.

In 1986, Avrakotos was concerned about a plan by Lieutenant Colonel Oliver North, a staff member of the National Security Council to trade arms in exchange for hostages – the Iran–Contra affair. (Note: The plan was to secretly sell weapons to the Khomeini government of the Islamic Republic of Iran, which was the subject of an international arms embargo. The profits were to fund the Contras right-wing rebel group in Nicaragua; funding for the Contras by the US government had been prohibited by the US Congress. The arms shipments were part of a process to free US hostages being held by the Hezbollah, a paramilitary group with ties to the Iranian Islamic Revolutionary Guard Corps. Israel was to ship weapons to Iran, for the US to resupply them, and for Israel to pay the US.) Avrakotos considered North part of a "lunatic fringe" following a reckless agenda that would go wrong for the CIA. He wrote a memo to the CIA management, outlining his concerns about North's activities and questioning the legality and morality of the organization's actions, but as Iran-Contra had presidential support, his intervention was deemed unwelcome, and Avrakotos was moved to the CIA's Africa Division.

=== Africa Division ===
Avrakotos was on the verge of marrying a fellow member of the CIA; his son from his first marriage was also a member of the CIA. Avrakotos realized that if he made a fuss about his sideways move, both of them could suffer professionally. He remained on the CIA's Africa desk until 1989, when he left the CIA.

== Post-CIA career ==
Avrakotos worked for defense contractor TRW Inc. in Rome, and then for News Corporation, where he worked in Rome and McLean, Virginia; he began a business intelligence newsletter at the company. Between 1997 and 2003, he returned to the CIA as a contractor.

== Personal life ==
Avrakotos was married twice. His first marriage ended in divorce before 1978. His second marriage, to Claudette – who also worked in the CIA – lasted 19 years, from 1986 until his death. Avrakotos and his first wife had a son, Gregory.

=== Death ===
Avrakotos died of a stroke on December 1, 2005, at Inova Fairfax Hospital in Northern Virginia. His funeral was held at St. Katherine's Greek Orthodox Church in Falls Church, Virginia.

== Honors and media ==
In 1988, Avrakotos was awarded the Intelligence Medal of Merit, and, in 2015, a bill was introduced into Congress to award him the Congressional Gold Medal.

Many of those who knew Avrakotos in a personal or non-professional capacity did not know of his work at the CIA, particularly in regard to Afghanistan, which changed in 2003 when Crile published Charlie Wilson's War: The Extraordinary Story of the Largest Covert Operation in History, his history of Operation Cyclone, which brought him into the public eye. Actor and producer Tom Hanks bought the rights to the book and made it the basis of the film Charlie Wilson's War, released in 2007, in which Avrakotos is portrayed by Philip Seymour Hoffman. Hoffman earned an Academy Award nomination for his performance.

== Notes and references ==
=== Sources ===
==== Books ====
- Adams, Jefferson (2014). Strategic Intelligence in the Cold War and Beyond. Abingdon, Oxon: Routledge. ISBN 978-1-3176-3769-1.
- Crile, George (2003). Charlie Wilson's War: The Extraordinary Story of the Largest Covert Operation in History. New York: Grove Press. ISBN 978-0-8021-4124-8.
- Davis, Mike (2007). Buda's Wagon: A Brief History of the Car Bomb. London: Verso. ISBN 978-1-8446-7132-8.
- Ewans, Martin (2005). Conflict in Afghanistan: Studies in Asymmetric Warfare. Abingdon, Oxon: Routledge. ISBN 978-0-4153-4160-8.
- Johnson, Chalmers (2008). Nemesis: The Last Days of the American Republic. New York: Henry Holt & Co. ISBN 978-0-8050-8728-4.
- Krishnan, Armin (2018). Why Paramilitary Operations Fail. New York: Palgrave Macmillan. doi:10.1007/978-3-319-71631-2. ISBN 978-3-319-71630-5.
- Prados, John (2007). Safe for Democracy. Chicago, Il: Ivan R. Dee. ISBN 978-1-5666-3574-5.

==== News sources ====
- "Coups Inside NATO: A Disturbing History". Yerepouni Daily News. July 28, 2016. p. 12.
- "Gust Avrakotos". Florida Today. December 6, 2005. p. 6.
- "Gust Avrakotos". The State. December 26, 2005. p. 5.
- Labbe, J. R. (September 7, 2008). "Charlie Wilson: Guns Ammo and Mules Defeat the Red Army". Fort Worth Star-Telegram. p. D.1.
- "Reagan's mixed White House legacy". BBC. 6 June 2004. Archived from the original on 9 February 2011.
- Sullivan, Patricia (December 25, 2005). "CIA agent Gust L. Avrakotos dies at age 67". Washington Post. p. C08. Archived from the original on July 15, 2018.
- Tady, Scott (December 19, 2007). "CIA agent and Aliquippa native helped down the Soviets". Beaver County Times. Archived from the original on April 26, 2009.

==== Websites ====
- "Charlie Wilson's War (2007)". AFI Catalog. American Film Institute.
- Clark, Gregory (2020). "Seven Ways to Compute the Relative Value of a US Dollar Amount – 1790 to Present". MeasuringWorth. Archived from the original on 8 April 2007.
- "Congressional Bills 114th Congress; H. R. 438". US Government Publishing Office. January 21, 2015.
- "The Iran-Contra Affair 20 Years On". National Security Archive. Archived from the original on 24 August 2017.
