= Howard Hart =

American Central Intelligence Agency officer (1940–2017)

Howard Phillips Hart
- Born: Howard Lester Phillips Jr. October 16, 1940; St. Louis, Missouri, U.S.
- Died: April 30, 2017 (aged 76); Dyke, Virginia, U.S.
- Education: Cornell University; University of Arizona
- Military career
- Allegiance: United States of America
- Branch: Central Intelligence Agency
- Service years: 1965–1984
- Conflicts: Iran, Afghanistan
- Awards: Distinguished Officer in the Senior Intelligence Service, Distinguished Intelligence Medal, Intelligence Medal of Merit, CIA 50th Anniversary Trailblazer Award

Howard Phillips Hart (born as Howard Lester Phillips Jr.; October 16, 1940 – April 30, 2017) was an American Central Intelligence Agency officer. He worked as the CIA chief of station in Islamabad, Pakistan from May 1981 until 1984. He was succeeded by William Piekney in the summer of 1984. He died on April 30, 2017.

== Early life ==
Hart was born Howard Lester Phillips Jr. on 16 October 1940 in St. Louis, Missouri, the only son of Eleanor Laidley and Howard Lester Phillips. Within months of his birth the family traveled to Manila, Philippines where Howard Sr. was an engineer with a U.S. firm. When the Japanese invaded Manila early in World War II, the family was interned first at the University of Santo Tomas in Manila, then moved to Los Banos. On 26 February 1945, The 11th Airborne Division jumped in behind Japanese lines and extricated the 2000+ internees under fire. They took them to Manila and onward to the United States.

Following their return to the United States, Eleanor and Howard Sr. divorced and Eleanor married Joseph Chittendon Hart. Joseph Hart was a banker with Citibank and following an assignment in Calcutta, India they returned to Manila in 1950.

Hart attended Kent School and graduated from Brent School in the Philippines in 1958. He attended Colgate University, where he was in Chi Psi fraternity, and the University of Arizona, and has both B.A. (Honors) and M.A. degrees in Oriental Studies and Political Science. His languages include Urdu, Indonesian, and German.

== Career ==
Hart joined the CIA after finishing graduate school at the University of Arizona in 1965. He spent two years at Camp Peary in Virginia, attending "the standard two-year course for ... aspiring case officers." He joined the Directorate of Operations after graduation.

A career Near East Division officer, Hart's overseas postings included five years in India; two years as a Chief of Station (COS) in the Persian Gulf; a three-year posting in Iran, before, during and after the Iranian Revolution (where he was Chief of Station after the Shah fell and the American Embassy was overrun by Khomeini elements); three years as COS Pakistan during the Soviet–Afghan War; and COS, Germany in the period leading up to the collapse of Communism.

In 1978 Hart began working the streets of Tehran. His reports that, contrary to over 15 years of CIA estimates, the Shah's rule was far from stable or secure were suppressed by more senior personnel within the CIA. He was captured a few days after the Shah's fall by an armed group of supporters of Ayatollah Ruhollah Khomeini, and escaped summary execution by appealing to a mullah, who agreed that the Koran did not sanction such punishment.

Immediately following his return from Iran in the fall of 1979 he was assigned to the Pentagon's "Iran Rescue Mission Joint Task Force" as the senior intelligence advisor to the Task Force commander. Hart established and managed an CIA-in-country support structure for the ill-fated Iran Rescue Mission in 1980, and accompanied the mission on deployment.

Hart jump-started the CIA's efforts to equip the Afghan resistance with weapons and supplies to allow them to mount an effective campaign during the Soviet occupation of Afghanistan. Hart was a weapons collector with a "passion for weapons and paramilitary tactics," making him a natural choice for the Islamabad post.

In 2010 Hart published a book called: Intelligence Thoughts: Afghanistan and Iran.

In 2015 Hart published A Life for a Life: A Memoir: My Career in Espionage Working for the Central Intelligence Agency ISBN 978-1-4834-3025-6.

== See also ==
- Michael Pillsbury
