= Charlie Wilson's War (book) =

Book by George Crile III

Charlie Wilson's War: The Extraordinary Story of the Largest Covert Operation in History
- Author: George Crile III
- Language: English
- Subject: Operation Cyclone
- Genre: Non-Fiction
- Set in: United States, Soviet Afghanistan
- Publisher: Atlantic Monthly Press
- Publication date: 2003
- Publication place: United States
- Media type: Book
- Pages: 560
- ISBN: 978-0871138545

Charlie Wilson's War: The Extraordinary Story of the Largest Covert Operation in History (later titled Charlie Wilson's War: The Extraordinary Story of How the Wildest Man in Congress and a Rogue CIA Agent Changed the History of Our Times) is a 2003 book by George Crile III. It details U.S. Representative Charlie Wilson's role in providing assistance to the Afghan Mujahideen during the Soviet–Afghan War.

The book depicts the Texas Congressman’s role in facilitating the CIA-led Operation Cyclone, a covert mission within Afghanistan. Wilson solicited the aid of CIA officer Gust Avrakotos, a member of a small team at the agency assigned to the Afghanistan portfolio, as well as then-CIA weapons specialist Mike Vickers. This operation would become one of the largest military operations ever undertaken by the CIA, spanning 13 years and running into the hundreds of millions of dollars. The book was based upon a series of interviews conducted by American journalist George Crile III, a producer for 60 Minutes. The book was received very positively in post-9/11 America, as the book presented the public with undisclosed information about the United States' dealings with the Afghan Mujahideen. Crile's book also details significant events that occurred over the course of the 13 years, how Charlie Wilson was able to run a covert war with very little oversight.

The book received praise from The New York Times, making it onto their best seller list. The book was also placed on Washington Post and Los Angeles Times best seller lists. It was adapted into the 2007 Mike Nichols film Charlie Wilson's War, in which Wilson was portrayed by Tom Hanks. The film went on to receive multiple Golden Globe award nominations.

== Synopsis ==
The book contains 33 chapters and an epilogue, spanning Representative Charlie Wilson's life from his early political career to the end of the Soviet-Afghan War. The book is based on a series of interviews that Crile conducted with Congressman Wilson. Crile also used his experiences of 14 years of reporting on Afghanistan and the Middle East for 60 Minutes. The critical revelation that the book exposes is the CIA covert Operation Cyclone, a program that was created due to the actions of Mr. Wilson.

The book focuses on Texas Congressman Charlie Wilson during the '70s, '80s, and '90s. It follows his role as the core agent that secured and supplied funds to Afghan Mujahideen during Operation Cyclone. His motivation to accomplish this goal originated from a US government appointment within Pakistan. On this trip, Congressman Wilson visited multiple refugee camps on the border of Afghanistan and Pakistan. It is here where he heard stories of the violence that was inflicted on the refugees by the Soviet troops. The camp is also where he learned that the rebels could not possibly win without assistance, due to the armaments they had at their disposal. Congressman Wilson then decided to assist the rebels with enough military aid to defeat the Soviet Union (USSR) in the Afghan-Soviet War.

Wilson accomplished this through his position on the House Appropriation Committee. The Congressman secured hundreds of millions of dollars through this posting, which he gave to the US Central Intelligence Agency (CIA). The mechanisms within the House Appropriation Committee allowed Wilson to conceal the purpose of the money from all but a select few governmental players. This meant that the broader government and public did not realise what he was doing. The Congressman then enlisted the help of CIA regional head director Gust Avrakotos to assist with the transportation of the funds and weapons to the Afghan rebels. Avrakotos was on the fringe within the CIA, not the traditional spy; being from a working class background, the only notable relationship outside the CIA was with the Congressman. The author also introduces Joanne Herring, a Texas socialite and religious zealot who was, at times, romantically involved with Wilson. Herring was close to Pakistan President Muhammad Zia-ul-Haq; she assisted Wilson in developing his own personal relationship with the president. Zia-ul-Haq was a critical part of the operation, as he allowed an avenue for the delivery of weapons across the pakistani border with Afghanistan.

The men conducted this operation without the public or the oversight from the US government and had no idea where the money was going due to its covert nature. The book reveals that the CIA provided not only money and weapons, but specialised training in urban warfare to the rebels. During this period, the public supported these ‘freedom fighters’ as aligned with the cultural values of the U.S. during this period. It also arrives at a reason for the distrust and eventual hostility between the mujahadeen and the United States government: the withdrawal of funding after the US met its principal goals of defeating the Soviet army. The book concludes with by pointing out how little support the US gave to rebuilding the nation after the war.

== History ==
The relevant history that the book follows is the United States Central Intelligence Agency (CIA) covert program Operation Cyclone. The operation's goal was to deliver arms, funds, and training to the Afghan Mujahideen within Afghanistan. The CIA provided this support to allow the rebels to defeat the new People's Democratic Party of Afghanistan, which was backed by the USSR in the Soviet-Afghan War. The time period of the operation was from 1979 to 1992. The conflict acted as a proxy war between the United States and the Soviet Union, CIA funding an insurgency against communism within the middle east. The key individuals in the formation and application of Operation Cyclone were Texas Congressman Charlie Wilson and CIA operator Gust Avrokotos. Both men enabled Operation Cyclone to become one of the most capital-intensive programs ever undertaken by the CIA.

The prelude to operation cyclone (the event the book is based on) was caused by the Saur Revolution of 1978. The revolution saw Afghanistan undergo a coup d’état in 1978, which saw the transfer of power from Mohammed Daoud Khan, the leader of the Republic of Afghanistan to the People’s Democratic Party of Afghanistan led by Nur Muhammad Taraki. Under the control of the PDPA, the state allied itself with the Soviet Union; these events, the overthrowing of the previous government, and the alinement with the Soviet Union caused the CIA to show interest in Afghanistan. Operation Cyclone was then created to combat the new state of the DRA. Its creation was directly linked to Representative Charlie Wilson, as he alone secured funds, then acquired the assistance of CIA agent Gust Avrokotos. Mr. Avrokotos was a crucial player in the implementation of the program. Congressman Wilson was inspired into action due to the CIA’s inaction in combating the USSR within Afghanistan plus the violence caused by the new state towards civilians.

The operation aimed to allow the ''Afghan Freedom Fighters'' to defeat the Communists within Afghanistan. This aligned firmly with United States foreign policy, freedom of democracy, and anti-communism rhetoric. Important events of the conflict; Charlie Wilson's constant support for the war; without the congressman's help, the operation would never have reached its goals. The congressman managed to increase funding for operation cyclone over the decade. Another key proponent of the war was Pakistani President Muhammad Zia-ul-Haq. The President allowed the guns and money to gain access into Afghanistan and into the hands of the freedom fighters. This was successful due to Congressman Wilson's special relationship with the President. Mr. Wilson also acquired the most up-to-date arms for the rebels, including the stinger missile. Anti-Air arms turned the tide of the conflict, because until these weapons, the Afghani Mujahideen couldn't fight against the Soviet helicopters.

The conclusion of Operation Cyclone led to criticism of the CIA, the key being the funding of Afghan Mujahideen that would splinter into modern-day terrorist organisations. The weapons, funds, and training used during the war allowed the groups to conduct terrorism across the middle east and worldwide. From a CIA standpoint, Operation Cyclone accomplished its goal; with vast sums of money, the Afghan Mujahedeen would defeat the Soviet-Union-backed Democratic Republic of Afghanistan. The end of the conflict saw the complete withdrawal of all support for the Afghan-Mujahedeen; this is one of the most significant failings of operation cyclone regarding US foreign policy. Gust Avrokotos would stress this point after the fall of the Democratic Republic of Afghanistan. Congressman Wilson, under this suggestion, attempted to direct funds towards rebuilding however was unsuccessful. Once the operation reached its goal, all funding would cease, even humanitarian aid for the rebuilding of the country.

== 2007 film ==
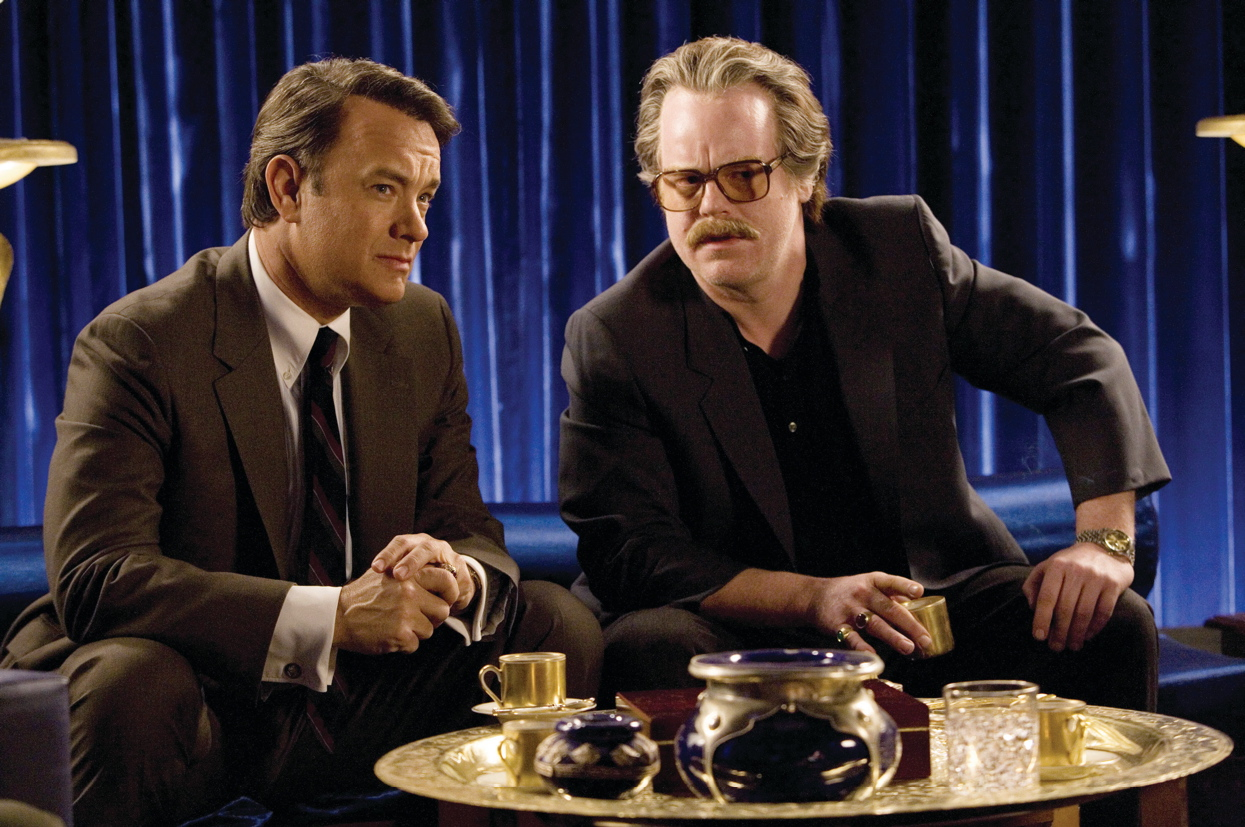
Charlie Wilson left played by Tom Hanks. Gust Avrokotos right played by Philip Seymour Hoffman.

The book was adapted into the 2007 film Charlie Wilson's War, starring Tom Hanks as Representative Charlie Wilson. It also starred Julia Roberts and Philip Seymour Hoffman. The film was written by Aaron Sorkin and directed by Mike Nichols and grossed $119.5 million at the box office. Universal Pictures produced the movie with an estimated budget of 75 million, runtime total 102 minutes. The film was met with critical praise, although it was criticized for certain historical inaccuracies. The film was nominated for five Golden Globe Awards, but did not win a single category. Philip Seymour Hoffman was nominated for an Academy Award for best supporting actor, but lost to Javier Bardem in No Country For Old Men.

A.O. Scott of The New York Times praised the film for its ability to dance the line of being an exciting picture without losing the importance of the story and the characters.

“That, at any rate, is pretty much the gist of “Charlie Wilson’s War,” which may be more of a hoot than any picture dealing with the bloody, protracted fight between the Soviet Army and the Afghan mujahedeen has any right to be"

— A.O. Scott, Good-Time Charlie’s Foreign Affairs, The New York Times

== Reception and significance ==
The book was especially well received in the United States, as the author exposed significant events in US history. In time, it found critical acclaim, appearing on the New York Times Best Seller list, while also making it onto the Washington Post and Los Angeles Times bestseller lists. Public interest in the events portrayed in the book led to the 2007 film adaptation of the same title. The film compressed times and merged characters and events, but kept the all the fundamental information about the operation intact. The film's largely positive reception generated further interest in the events narrated.

George Crile III’s book exposed the undertakings of a highly covert operation that spanned decades. The codenamed Operation Cyclone became the most expensive covert operation orchestrated by the United States government; carried out by the Central Intelligence Agency. The capital required for the armament of the Afghan-Mujahedeen totalled billions of dollars, and the funding dramatically increased towards the tail end of the conflict. The book demonstrated how the United States was able to fund Islamic Jihad to defeat and help win the Soviet-Afghan War. It also showed how one-man Representative Charlie Wilson was able to divert hundreds of millions a year to a covert operation without the knowledge of the wider government or the public.

Crile points to the urban warfare training that the CIA gave to the rebels; this includes explosive training (bomb construction) with little equipment available, i.e. pipe bombs. Crile cities this training as a potential impact on modern day terrorism within Afghanistan. Another factor that Crile points to is the Stinger Missiles, a revolutionary weapon for the Ground to Air offensive. The Stinger missiles were given to the 'freedom fighters' near the end of the conflict to assist with the lack of any air defense or offensive capabilities. The results of all the funds and support over the decades leading to a victory within Afghanistan for the Mujahideen. The fall of the Democratic Republic of Afghanistan saw a major civil war occur in the interim. The blowback of the Soviet Union’s defeat within the state caused some scholars to cite this defeat as another precursor to the fall of the Soviet Union.

The book had significant political implications when it was released in 2003. For the first time, it provided the public with clarity regarding the United States government spending. Concluded with 3 billion dollars across a thirteen-year period, given directly to the Afghan Freedom Fighters. The information was apparent in a post 9/11 political climate, as the book demonstrated a time when the United States government backed the Mujahideen. Crile also made a case that Islamic terrorism towards the United States soured after the end of CIA-backed military aid towards jihad within Afghanistan, that didn't have a long-term plan after the Soviet defeat, leaving the country poorer and ravaged by war and internal conflict, which eventually led to the rise of the Taliban to its highest ranks.
