= Javed Nasir =

Pakistani military officer (1936–2024)

Javed Nasir HI(M) SBt
- جاويد ناصر
- Born: Javed Nasir; 22 December 1936; Lahore, Punjab Province, British India
- Died: 16 October 2024 (aged 87); Lahore, Punjab, Pakistan
- Burial place: Lahore, Punjab, Pakistan
- Military career
- Allegiance: Pakistan
- Branch: Pakistan Army
- Service years: 1958–1993
- Rank: Lieutenant-General
- Service number: PA – 5646
- Unit: Pakistan Army Corps of Engineers
- Commands: DG ISI; Engineer-in-Chief; Chairman POF; Chief Instructor at NDC; Ojhri Cantonment; Frontier Works Organization
- Conflicts: Indo-Pakistani War of 1965; Indo-Pakistani War of 1971; Kashmiri insurgency First Afghan Civil War; Bosnian War
- Awards: Hilal-e-Imtiaz (Military) Sitara-e-Basalat
- Other work: Missionary for Tablighi Jamaat; Later, a hedge fund manager, and private security contractor

Javed Nasir HI(M) SBt (Urdu: جاويد ناصر; 22 December 1936 – 16 October 2024) was a Pakistani military officer who served as the Director-General of the Inter-Services Intelligence (ISI), appointed on 14 March 1992 until 13 May 1993.

Known for being member of Tablighi Jamaat, Nasir gained national prominence as his role of bringing the unscattered mass of Afghan Mujahideen to agree to the power-sharing formula to form Afghan administration under President Mojaddedi in Afghanistan in 1992–93. Later, he played an influential and decisive role in the Bosnian War when he oversaw the covert military intelligence programme to support the Bosnian Army against the Serbs, while airlifting the thousands of Bosnian refugees in Pakistan.

== Early life and education ==
Javed Nasir was born in Lahore, Punjab in British India on 22 December 1936, and was Punjabi Kashmiri. His father was a school headmaster. After his intermediate from Government College, Lahore, where he was part of the college cricket team, Nasir joined the Pakistan Army and entered in the Pakistan Military Academy at Kakul in 1956, where he excelled in science subjects and written English.

In 1967, Nasir qualified as a licensed professional engineer (PE) by the Pakistan Engineering Council (PEC).

After the third war with India in 1971, Maj. Nasir went to Australia where he attended and graduated in staff course from the Australian Army Staff College. In 1980s, he was sent to attend the National Defence University (NDU) in Islamabad, and graduated with MSc in Strategic studies.

In 1983–90, Major-General Nasir joined the faculty of the Armed Forces War College of the NDU, where he taught courses on war studies for seven years, eventually being promoted as chief instructor.

== Military career ==
=== Commission and early service (1958–1964) ===
He was commissioned in the Corps of Engineers in 1958 and commanded a sapper platoon. Between 1958 and 1959 he was attached to the Frontier Force Regiment as an infantry officer, serving as Company 2 i/c and staff officer-communications of an infantry battalion. He was attached to the East Pakistan Rifles as a company commander between 1959 and 1962. Thereafter he commanded a pioneer company attached to the Independent Engineering Brigade, Force Command Northern Areas Gilgit between 1962 and 1964.

=== Instructional and staff roles (1964–1971) ===
Promoted to major in 1964, he was posted as an instructor at the Engineering Corps Recruit & Training Depot Risalpur.

He was known to have served in the combat engineering formations during the second war with India in 1965 as army captain.

In 1966, he was assigned to a staff position in the Quartermaster General office in the GHQ until the end of the year. He was then posted as a senior instructor in the Military College of Engineering, Risalpur until 1969. He attended the Command & Staff College Quetta for senior Command Course (to be eligible to command Battalions and Brigades) in 1969–1970.

=== Command and senior roles (1971–1985) ===
He was promoted to Lieutenant Colonel in 1971 and to Colonel in 1976. For a time between 1978 and 1980 he commanded an infantry battalion i.e. the 3rd Battalion, Azad Kashmir Regiment. He was thereafter posted as Colonel GS of the 25th Mechanized Division, Malir. He was promoted to brigadier in 1981 and commanded the Independent Engineering Brigade at Gilgit until 1983. Thereafter he was posted as a Senior Instructor in Command & Staff College Quetta until 1985 until being promoted to major general. His first assignment as major general was as major general – engineering, attached to the office of DGMO, GHQ. He gained commission as second lieutenant in the Corps of Engineers of the Pakistan Army, where his career was mostly spent.

=== Senior military appointments (1985–1992) ===
In the military circles, Maj-Gen. Nasir was described as a "moderate person" who, after experimenting with a "libertine lifestyle" in his younger years, rediscovered Islam in 1986 during the midst of the Russian war in neighbouring Afghanistan. In 1988, Maj-Gen. Nasir gained public fame when he was appointed inspector-general of engineering formation that investigated the environmental disaster at the military storage located in the Rawalpindi Cantonment. Against the United States, German and French military estimation, Maj-Gen. Nasir personally led his formation on the ground to clear out the entire storage containing the chemical and explosive materials, as well as the missile ordnance in mere two weeks.

In 1989, he was appointed director-general of Frontier Works Organization (FWO) and supervised the civil construction of the Skardu International Airport which is 11,944 feet (3,641 m) above sea level. On 24 September 1991, Maj-Gen. Nasir was promoted as a three-star rank army general, having been appointed to command the Corps of Engineers as its Eng-in-C at the Army GHQ in Rawalpindi. On 4 February 1992, Lieutenant-General Nasir was then posted as the chairman of the Pakistan Ordnance Factories at Wah in Punjab, Pakistan, until being appointed the Director-General of the Inter-Services Intelligence (ISI).

== Director of ISI (1992–1993) ==
On 14 March 1992, Prime Minister Nawaz Sharif appointed Lt-Gen Nasir as the Director-General of the Inter-Services Intelligence (ISI) against the recommendations and wishes of General Asif Nawaz, then-chief of army staff (COAS). The appointment was seen as a political motive for Prime Minister Nawaz Sharif since General Nasir had no experience in the intelligence gathering network and was virtually a ghost in country's intelligence community. At that time, Prime Minister Sharif had family relations with Lt-Gen. Nasir Javed, and knew him very well.

In the military, he was of the view of anti-American sentiments, accusing the United States of using Islam for political reasons and against Russians in Europe, which further complicated the foreign relations between two nations. He also limited the cooperation between the ISI and CIA to fight against the global terrorism, thwarting any joint efforts to fight against extremism. Though, he did help the US to relocate and retrieve the missing guided missiles from Afghanistan based on a mutual understanding of such weapons may have fallen into wrong hands.

It was during this time when ISI had been running an intensified support of insurgency in Indian-administered Jammu and Kashmir. In spite of his seniority in the military, Nasir was overlooked, and was never considered for the promotion of the four-star rank and appointment by the government during the appointment process for the command of the Army, the Chief of Army Staff (COAS). Lt-Gen Nasir was among the five senior and superseding army generals when the junior-most Lt-Gen Abdul Waheed Kakar was elevated to the four-star rank and promotion to command the army.

=== Peshawar Accord and Mojaddedi administration ===
In April 1992, Lt-Gen. Nasir became an international figure when he played major role in amalgamating the unscattered Afghan mujahideen groups when the power-sharing formula was drafted. Due to his religiosity, Nasir used his persuasive power and motivational talks to agree to power-sharing formula and, witnessed to have successfully established an Afghan administration under cleric President Sibghatullah Mojaddedi in Kabul.

=== Bosnian War ===
In the military and political circles, Nasir had a reputation to be a practising Muslim who would not compromise on the interests of Islam and Pakistan. In 1992–93, Nasir defied the UN arms embargo placed on Bosnia and Herzegovina when he successfully airlifted the POF's sophisticated anti-tank guided missiles, which helped the Bosnian state forces to force the Serbs to lift the siege much to the annoyance of the U.S. government. While airlifting sophisticated anti-tank guided missiles to Bosnian state forces, he pushed the Government of Pakistan to allow the Bosnian immigration to Pakistan.

In 2011, the International Criminal Tribunal for the former Yugoslavia demanded the custody of the former ISI director for his alleged support of the Inter-Services Intelligence activities in Bosnia and Herzegovina to state forces of Bosnia against the Yugoslav forces and Serbian rebels in the 1990s, the Government of Pakistan refused to hand Nasir to the UN tribunal, citing poor health.

=== Removal from the ISI ===
The Chairman joint chiefs General Shamim Alam had completely lost the control of the ISI when the agency was running under Nasir's command. General Abdul Waheed Kakar, the army chief at that time, had been at odds with Lt-Gen. Nasir due to his preaching of Islamic tradition in the military. In the views of senior military officers in the Pakistani military and the civilian officials of the Ministry of Defence, Lt-Gen. Nasir was often a figure of fun whose intellect was far from being as outstanding as his white beard.

During this time, the Indian government led by Prime Minister P. V. Narasimha Rao levelled several accusations against him of supporting the Khalistan movement, the Indian Mafia and Dawood Ibrahim– the accusations he swiftly denied in 2008. At home, Nasir began facing accusations from Pakistan Peoples Party politicians of supporting the conservative Islamic agenda in the country.

In 1993, the United States formally registered their complaints to Pakistan when U.S. secretary of State James Baker had written a memo to Prime Minister Sharif putting his country on a terror watch list and was in danger of being listed as terror-supporting nation. Responding to the complaint, Prime Minister Sharif used diplomacy when he sent his Foreign Secretary Shahryar Khan and Pakistan Senator Akram Zaki to United States assuring of Pakistan's policy of not supporting the militancy in the region.

During this time, several Arab countries such as Egypt, Tunisia, Algeria, and the Philippines, lodged a strong protest against Nasir of supporting the radical movements in their respected countries.

Following the removal of Prime Minister Sharif, the caretaker Prime Minister Balakh Sher Mazari fired and sacked Nasir from the directorship of the ISI, and President of Pakistan Ghulam Ishaq Khan approved his premature retirement from his military commission effective from 13 May 1993— he only led the ISI for 13 months.

Upon Nasir's dismissal, the new DG ISI, J.A. Qazi eventually led the massive arrests of thousands of Arab Afghans and forced the al-Qaeda to relocate itself in Afghanistan permanently. After expulsion from Pakistan, many escaped to Bosnia to participate in the war. According to many political commentators and journalists, Nasir's firing from ISI was not at the behest of the United States but, it was the friendly Arab countries' protests and pressure at the Organisation of Islamic Cooperation (OIC) that resulted in his departure from ISI and the retirement from his 40-year long service with the military.

== Later life ==
After his premature retirement, Nasir became a missionary for a Tablighi Jamaat, and went to the private sector where he managed and chaired the private equity firm and hedge fund, the Evacuee Trust Property Board (ETPB), when he was appointed on 14 July 1997 for a two-year contract.

In 1998, he was appointed chairman of Pakistan Sikh Gurdwara Prabandhak Committee (PSGPC), an organisation promoting the well-being of Sikhs in Pakistan as well as pilgrimages from abroad. Through effective management of Trust properties, he generated Rs 1.17 billion in revenue in a single year, exceeding the combined total of all his predecessors. Recognizing the misallocation of diaspora donations that were previously diverted to India via the Indian Sikh Gurdwara Parbandhak Committee (SGPC), Nasir invoked a Sikh religious injunction that mandated donations remain with the intended Gurdwara. This reform redirected significant funds to Pakistani shrines. Under his leadership, several Sikh Gurdwaras in Pakistan, which had long suffered from neglect and decay, received restoration. Notably, the initial structure of Darbar Sahib Kartarpur, abandoned since its foundation in 1947, was constructed during his tenure. The Sikh community widely recognized and appreciated his contributions to preserving their religious heritage.

In October 1998, Prime Minister Sharif appointed him as his intelligence adviser but this appointment remained for short period of time. For sometime, he served on the security details as head of security for the Sharif family, but the PML(N)'s lawmakers and Sharif family cut off their links and distanced themselves from Nasir after the 9/11 terrorist attacks in the United States in 2001.

In 2002–03, Nasir filed a lawsuit at the Anti Terrorism Court against the media corporations: the Daily Jang, and the News International, for character defamation when investigative articles published on him regarding monetary embezzlement when he managed the private hedge fund in Lahore.

In 2007, he appeared on the Geo News and denied any allegations of terror-supporting that was levelled on him during his time as Director ISI, when interviewed by Iftikhar Ahmad. At this detailed and hour-long interview, he was of the view that 9/11 was an inside job, and maintained his stance on the suppressing of the free-energy by the U.S. and Pakistan Government.

In 2011, the International Criminal Tribunal for the former Yugoslavia demanded the custody of Nasir for his alleged authorization of the covert programme to support to the Bosnian Army against the Serbian army in 1990s, the Government of Pakistan refused to hand Nasir to the UN tribunal, citing poor health and memory loss due to a road accident.

In 2013, Nasir reportedly spoke against Afghan Taliban and the terrorism at the Supreme Court convention, and criticised the Taliban as an armed violent group and criticised their supporting the violent terrorism for their cause, in a response to the church bombing.

Nasir died in Lahore on 16 October 2024, at the age of 87.

== Awards and decorations ==

Hilal-e-Imtiaz (Military) (Crescent of Excellence)
Sitara-e-Basalat (Star of Good Conduct)	Sitara-e-Harb 1965 War (War Star 1965)	Tamgha-e-Jang 1965 War (War Medal 1965)	Tamgha-e-Jang 1971 War (War Medal 1971)
10 Years Service Medal	20 Years Service Medal	30 Years Service Medal	Tamgha-e-Sad Saala Jashan-e- Wiladat-e-Quaid-e-Azam (100th Birth Anniversary of Muhammad Ali Jinnah) 1976
Tamgha-e-Jamhuria (Republic Commemoration Medal) 1956	Hijri Tamgha (Hijri Medal) 1979	Jamhuriat Tamgha (Democracy Medal) 1988	Qarardad-e-Pakistan Tamgha (Resolution Day Golden Jubilee Medal) 1990

== See also ==
- Bosnian War
- History of the United States (1991–2008)
- Conservatism in Pakistan
- Blowback (intelligence)
- Flip-flop
- History of Afghanistan (1992–present)
- India and state-sponsored terrorism
- Foreign policy of Pakistan
  - Islamic conservatism
  - Sikhism in Pakistan
  - Muslim Ummah
  - Pakistan and state-sponsored terrorism
  - Pakistan military presence in other countries

Military offices
Preceded by Asad Durrani	Director General of the Inter-Services Intelligence; 1992–1993	Succeeded by Javed Ashraf Qazi
