= Kosovo–Pakistan relations =

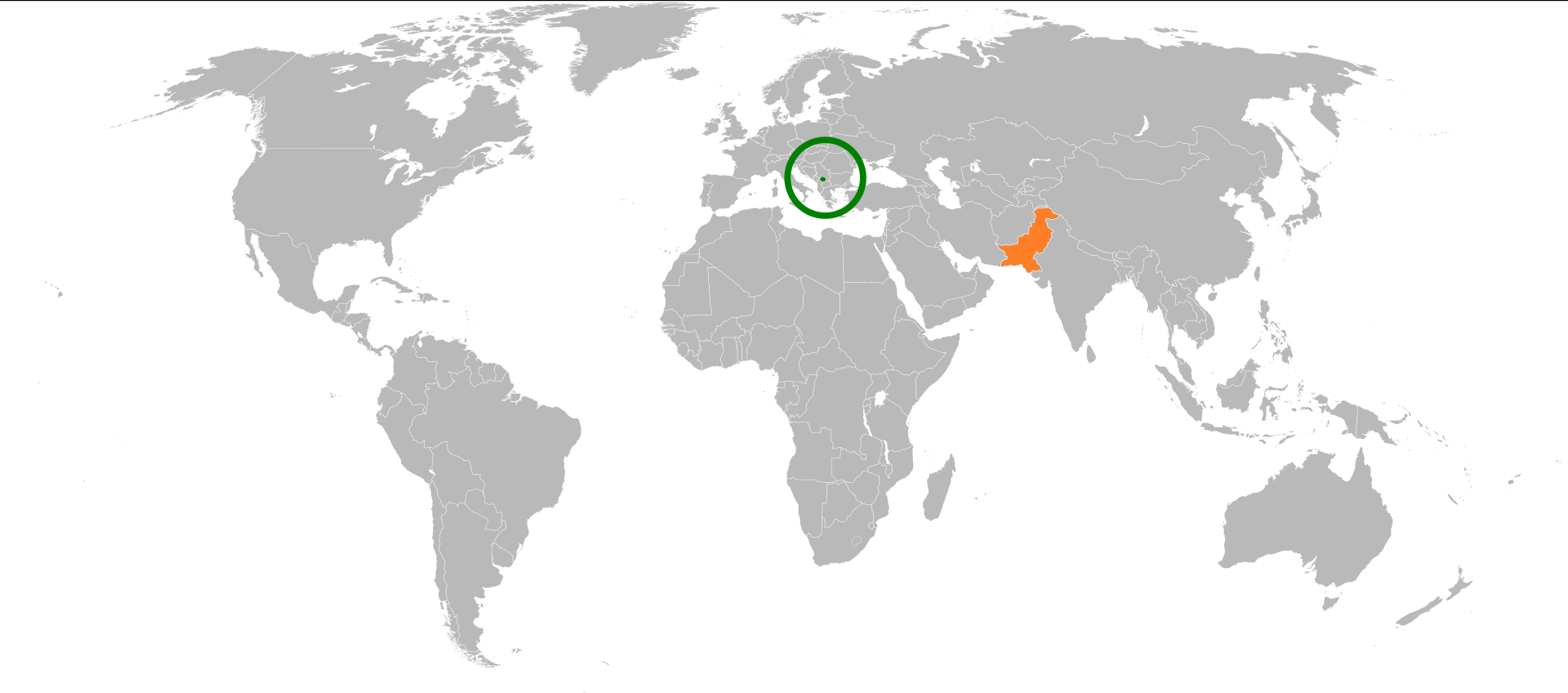
- Kosovo: Pakistan

Diplomatic mission
- Embassy of Kosovo (Turkey), Ankara: Embassy of Pakistan (Turkey), Ankara

Kosovo–Pakistan relations refer to the bilateral ties between the Republic of Kosovo and the Islamic Republic of Pakistan. Kosovo is a partially recognized state that is claimed by Serbia in its entirety as the Serbian province of Kosovo and Metohija. On 24 December 2012, Pakistan recognized Kosovo as an independent state, becoming the 98th state to do so. Simultaneously, Pakistan's ambassador to Turkey in Ankara was accredited to Kosovo.

== Reaction before the recognition ==
In February 2008, the Pakistani Foreign Ministry released the following statement: "We understand and support the legitimate aspirations of the Kosovars and the need for peace in Kosovo and the region. Pakistan is watching the developments in Kosovo carefully. We have noted the recognition extended by a number of important countries to the declaration of independence by the Kosovo Parliament and the statement made by the OIC Secretary General expressing happiness over this development, and solidarity and support with the Kosovars. Our policy will be guided by these developments and the aspirations of the people of Kosovo. It remains our earnest desire that situation remains calm and peaceful in Kosovo and the region."

At a meeting on 28 January 2009 between the Kosovan Foreign Minister, Skënder Hyseni, and Mr. Shahbaz, Pakistan's Ambassador to Austria, the ambassador said that the people and Government of Pakistan support Kosovo on its path. He said that Pakistan is conducting intensive talks with its neighbours and other members of the OIC on the issue, and that it is just a matter of time before Pakistan makes the decision to recognise Kosovo or not. At a different meeting on 26 May 2009 between Hyseni and Hussain Haroon, the representative of Pakistan to the UN, Mr. Haroon stated that "we [Pakistan] definitively support your cause".

In a 20 May 2010 conversation with the Turkish Prime Minister, Recep Tayyip Erdoğan, Pakistani Prime Minister Syed Yusuf Raza Gilani said that "Pakistan was keenly observing the current situation" in Kosovo, and that it would wait for the ICJ's opinion before making a decision.

In April 2011, a Pakistani Foreign Office official stated that "Islamabad is willing to recognise the Republic of Kosovo, but the situation in Balochistan does not allow us to do so". He stated that Pakistan "is being pressed by several Muslim states and the United States to recognise the republic." In addition, the Kosovan people, who had been supported by the United States in their freedom struggle against Serbian occupation, "are also eagerly awaiting recognition by Pakistan". The official said that "we are sorry we can't do so [recognise Kosovo]". "Pakistan finds it impossible to translate its desire into a reality." On 13 April 2011, Israr Hussain the Director for Europe at the Ministry of Foreign Affairs of Pakistan stated that the issue of Kosovo's recognition by Pakistan will be discussed very soon and that it is a priority for the Government of Islamabad.

== Recognition and aftermath ==
On 13 December 2011, then Serbian Foreign Minister Vuk Jeremić said, during a visit to Pakistan, that Pakistan supports the sovereignty and territorial integrity of Serbia and does not support the independence of Kosovo. However, on 21 December 2012, it was reported that Pakistan recognised Kosovo. On 24 December 2012 the Government of Pakistan announced their recognition of the Republic of Kosovo. Simultaneously, they established diplomatic relations with Pakistan's Ambassador to the Republic of Turkey in Ankara, being accredited to the Republic of Kosovo as non-resident Ambassador.

In late October 2013 during a meeting in London between Kosovan President Atifete Jahjaga and Pakistani Prime Minister Nawaz Sharif it was agreed to boost economic trade between the two countries and avoid double taxation on goods. Each leader was invited and to one another's country for a state visit, and both leaders accepted the invitation. At the meeting Pakistan also agreed to support Kosovo's membership in the Organisation of Islamic Cooperation.

In 2017, Pakistan and Kosovo agreed to strengthen bilateral ties.

- Pakistan–Serbia relations
- Pakistan–Yugoslavia relations
