= Inter-Services Intelligence activities in Bosnia and Herzegovina =

Pakistani intelligence operations against Serb forces during the Bosnian War

- Part of Bosnian War
- Operational scope: Strategic and Tactical
- Location: Former Yugoslavia
- Objective: Operational
- Date: 1992—1995

The Inter-Services Intelligence (ISI) intelligence agency of Pakistan allegedly ran an active military intelligence program during the Bosnian War which started in 1992 lasting until 1995. Allegedly executed and supervised by General Javed Nasir, the program distributed and coordinated the systematic supply of arms to ARBiH during the war. The ISI Bosnian contingent was organized with financial assistance provided by Saudi Arabia, according to the British historian Mark Curtis.

Pakistan declared in a meeting of Muslim countries at Geneva in July 1995 that the UN arms embargo was illegal. Farooq Leghari, then president of Pakistan, stated that 'the Western policy of appeasement of the Serbian aggressors is not going to pay.' Pakistan subsequently declared that it would provide weapons to the Bosnian government in spite of the UN arms embargo. Pakistan became the fourth largest contributor of troops to the UN peacekeeping forces in Bosnia and pledged to keep its soldiers there to protect Bosnian Muslims and confront the Serbs while France and other countries wanted to withdraw their troops for the safety of their soldiers.

Nasir later confessed that, despite the UN arms embargo in Bosnia, the ISI airlifted anti-tank weapons and missiles to ARBiH which turned the tide in favor of Bosniaks and forced the Serbs to lift the siege. In 2011, the International Criminal Tribunal for the former Yugoslavia demanded the custody of the former ISI director for his alleged support to forces of the Bosnian government against the Army of Republika Srpska in the 1990s, the Government of Pakistan has refused to hand Nasir to the UN tribunal, citing poor health.

During the height of the conflict, Pakistan's Foreign Ministry evacuated many endangered Bosnians from the conflict areas who immigrated to Pakistan. The small nature of the program was mentioned and highlighted in the Pakistani drama, Alpha Bravo Charlie in 1998. Since then, foreign relations have improved between Pakistan and Bosnia.

== See also ==
- Inter-Services Intelligence activities in Afghanistan
- Inter-Services Intelligence activities in India
- Foreign relations of Pakistan
- Bosnia and Herzegovina–Pakistan relations

== External research ==
- Scott, Peter Dale (2007). The Road to 9/11: Wealth, Empire, and the Future of America. California: University of California Press. p. 148. ISBN 978-0520929944.
