= Pakistan–Yugoslavia relations =

- Pakistan: Yugoslavia

Pakistan and Yugoslavia

Pakistan–Yugoslavia relations (Urdu: پاکستان-یوگوسلاویہ کی تعلقات, Serbian: Пакистанско-Југословенски односи, romanized: Pakistansko-Jugoslovenski odnosi) were historical foreign relations between Pakistan and now split-up Socialist Federal Republic of Yugoslavia. The two countries developed congenial relations despite the close Yugoslav association and cooperation with India (with which Pakistan had conflictual relations). Yugoslav proximity to India, however, partially limited development of relations between the two countries. The formal diplomatic relations were established on 18 May 1948. The first trade agreement between Pakistan and Yugoslavia was signed in 1949 while Yugoslavia became the first socialist state to provide development credits to Pakistan. In early years after the World War II Yugoslavia tried to stay neutral in disputes between India and Pakistan. This changed after the India, Yugoslavia and Egypt initiated the establishment of the Non-aligned Movement while Pakistan joined Western Bloc led Southeast Asia Treaty Organization. On 13 till 16 January 1961 President of Pakistan Ayub Khan paid the first State visit of Pakistan to Yugoslavia. This visit was part of his efforts to strengthen relations with Yugoslavia despite this country's close relations with New Delhi. Pakistan diplomacy was however shocked when in 1965 Yugoslavia issued joint communique with India stating that the Kashmir question was as an internal affair of India. After Pakistani protests Yugoslavia took a more balanced approach during the Indo-Pakistani War of 1965, it supported Tashkent Declaration and was not opposed to Pakistani membership in the Non-Aligned Movement. In 1968 the credits given by Yugoslavia to Pakistan amounted to 104.7 million US dollars. In 1968 President of Yugoslavia Josip Broz Tito paid his first return State visit to Pakistan.

== See also ==
- Yugoslavia and the Non-Aligned Movement
- Bosnia and Herzegovina–Pakistan relations
- Pakistan–Serbia relations
- Death and state funeral of Josip Broz Tito
