= Pakistan–Serbia relations =

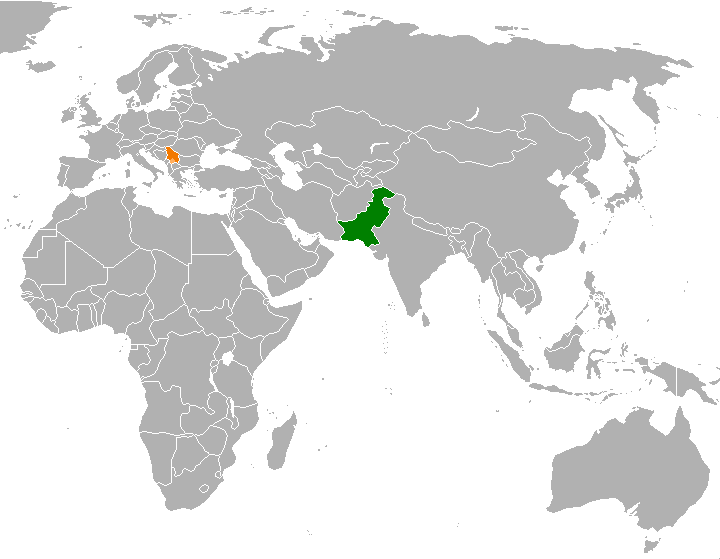
- Pakistan: Serbia

Diplomatic mission
- Embassy of Pakistan, Belgrade: Embassy of Serbia (China), Beijing

Pakistan and Serbia maintain diplomatic relations established between Pakistan and SFR Yugoslavia in 1948. From 1948 to 2006, Pakistan maintained relations with the Socialist Federal Republic of Yugoslavia (SFRY) and the Federal Republic of Yugoslavia (FRY) (later Serbia and Montenegro), of which Serbia is considered shared (SFRY) or sole (FRY) legal successor.

In 2012, Pakistan recognized independence of Kosovo, a partially recognized state that is claimed by Serbia in its entirety as the autonomous province.

== Resident diplomatic missions ==
- Pakistan has an embassy in Belgrade.
- Serbia is accredited to Pakistan through its embassy in Beijing (China).
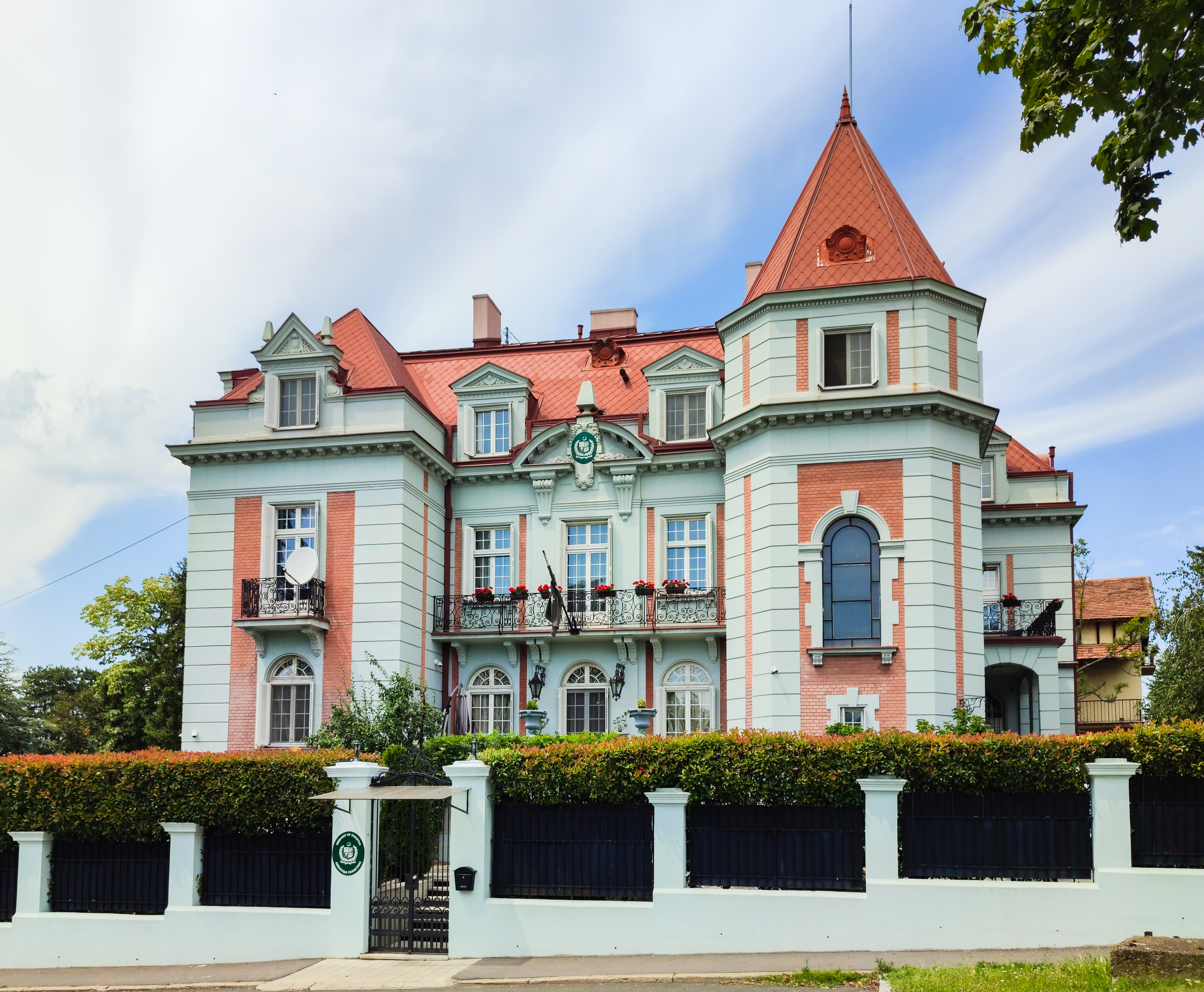
Embassy of Pakistan in Belgrade

== See also ==
- Foreign relations of Pakistan
- Foreign relations of Serbia
- Pakistan–Yugoslavia relations
- Yugoslavia and the Non-Aligned Movement
