= Operation MIAS =

Mission by the Central Intelligence Agency

An arms-reduction mission run by the American Central Intelligence Agency, Operation MIAS (Missing in Action Stingers) was tasked with buying back Stinger missiles given to the Mujahideen to fight the Soviet invasion of Afghanistan. Information about the program remains classified, although information has been gleaned from media accounts and government officials speaking off the record.

== Timeline ==
Launched in 1990 with a Congressional earmark of $10 million, the operation competed against Chechen, Azeri and Iranian arms dealers anxious to capitalise on the break-up of the Soviet Union and impending battles among satellite states, as well as drug dealers looking for weapons to fend off aircraft in their space.

The price of a Stinger was estimated at $300,000. Other sources suggested that the weapons, which cost $20,000 to produce, were only selling for $100,000 on the black market, still much higher than the $70,000 that the CIA initially offered Afghans to turn them over.

In 1993, the CIA approached Congress noting that they required an additional $55 million to buy back the weapons, noting that a failure to secure the missiles could result in attacks against American civil aircraft.

In 1998, Felix Sater provided the CIA with the location and serial numbers of approximately 10 Stingers held by the Northern Alliance.

== Results ==
The mission was dubbed a "failure" by the Stockholm International Peace Research Institute, due to its inability to track the widely-dispersed weapons through decentralised groups, leaving hundreds of the devices in the hands of warlords and militants. The Institute unfavourably compared the results of the Afghanistan failure, with the success of the similar program which netted 41 out of the 43 missiles Eritrea had given Somali National Alliance leader Hussein Aideed in 1998.
