= FIM-92 Stinger =

U.S. man-portable surface-to-air missile

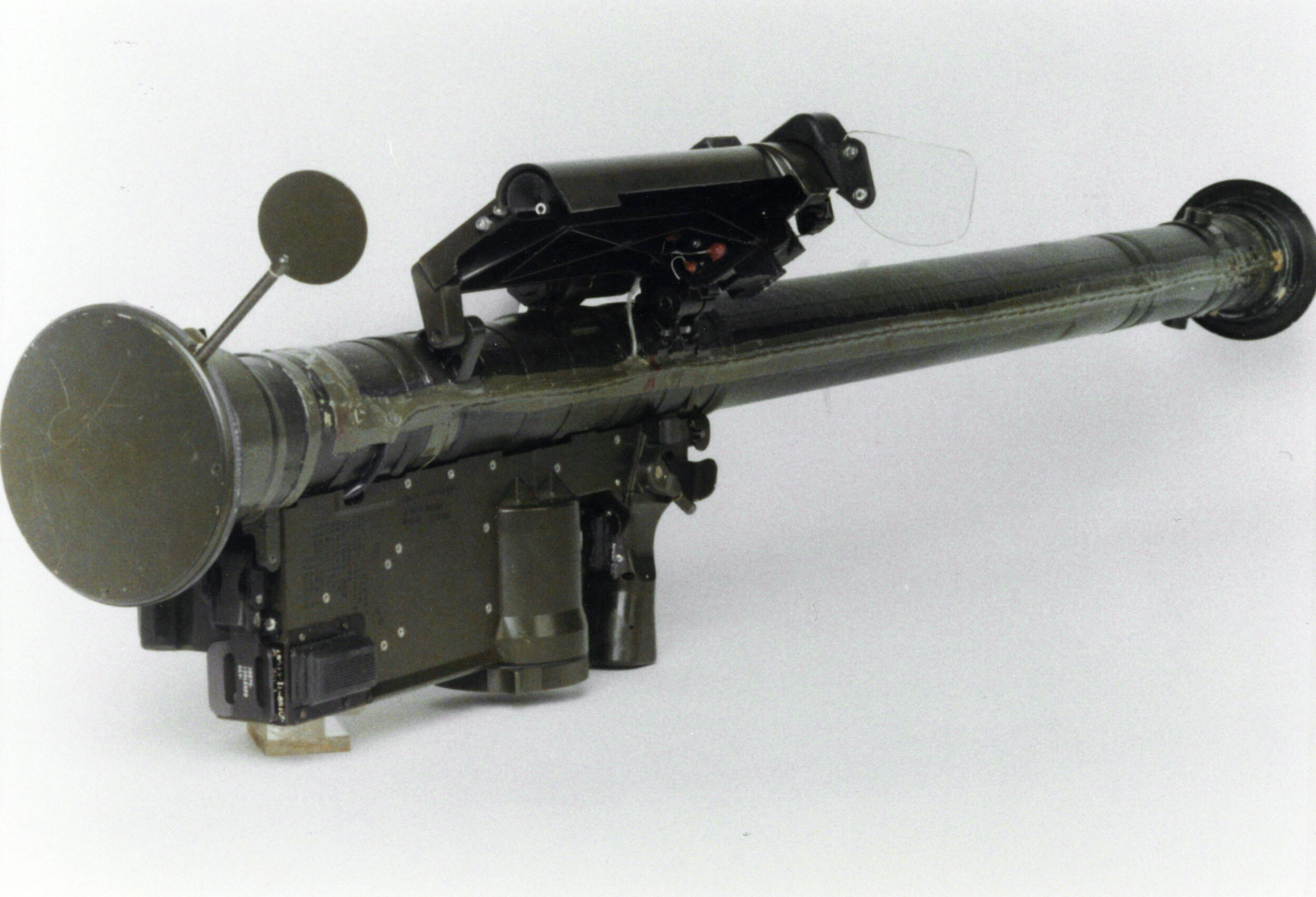
- FIM-92 Stinger launcher
- Type: Man-portable surface-to-air missile
- Place of origin: United States

Service history
- In service: 1981–present
- Used by: See Operators
- Wars: Falklands War; Soviet–Afghan War; Iran–Iraq War; Gulf War; Angolan Civil War; Sri Lankan Civil War; Chadian–Libyan conflict Tajikistani Civil War; Kargil War; Yugoslav Wars; Invasion of Grenada; Second Chechen War; War in Afghanistan; Iraq War; Syrian Civil War; War in Iraq (2013–2017); Russo-Ukrainian War

Production history
- Designer: General Dynamics
- Designed: 1967
- Manufacturer: Raytheon Missiles & Defense
- Developed from: FIM-43 Redeye
- Unit cost: FIM-92A: U.S.$38,000 (missile only, 1980 FY) ($119,320 2020 FY)
- Produced: 1978–present
- Variants: FIM-92A, FIM-92B, FIM-92C, FIM-92D, FIM-92G

Specifications
- Mass: Missile – 22 lb (10.1 kg); System – 35 lb (15.7 kg)
- Length: At launch – 5 ft (1.53 m); In flight – 4 ft 6 in (1.37 m)
- Diameter: 2.8 in (70 mm)
- Wingspan: 6.3 in (160 mm)
- Crew: 1
- Effective firing range: 0.1–3 mi (0.16–4.83 km)
- Warhead: HE-FRAG
- Warhead weight: 6.6 lb (3 kg)
- Detonation mechanism: Impact
- Engine: Solid-fuel rocket motor
- Maximum speed: Mach 2.2 (2,440 ft/s; 745 m/s; 1,670 mph)
- Guidance system: Infrared homing
- Launch platform: MANPADS, M6 Linebacker, Multi-Mission Launcher, Eurocopter Tiger, AN/TWQ-1 Avenger, MQ-1 Predator, AH-64 Apache, T129 ATAK
- References: Janes

The FIM-92 Stinger is an American-designed man-portable air-defense system (MANPADS) that operates as an infrared homing surface-to-air missile (SAM). It can be adapted to fire from a wide variety of ground vehicles, and from helicopters and drones as the Air-to-Air Stinger (ATAS). It entered service in 1981 and is used by the militaries of the United States and 29 other countries. Principally manufactured by Raytheon Missiles & Defense, it is also produced under license by Airbus Defence and Space in Germany and by Roketsan in Turkey.

== Description ==
The FIM-92 Stinger is a passive surface-to-air missile that can be shoulder-fired by a single operator (although standard military procedure calls for two operators, team chief and gunner). The Stinger was intended to supplant the FIM-43 Redeye system, the principal difference being that, unlike the Redeye, the Stinger can acquire the target from head-on, giving much more time to acquire and destroy the target. The FIM-92B missile can also be fired from the M1097 Avenger and the M6 Linebacker. The missile is also capable of being deployed from a Humvee Stinger rack and can be used by airborne troops. A helicopter launched version exists and is called Air-to-Air Stinger (ATAS).

MANPADS Stinger with IFF antenna

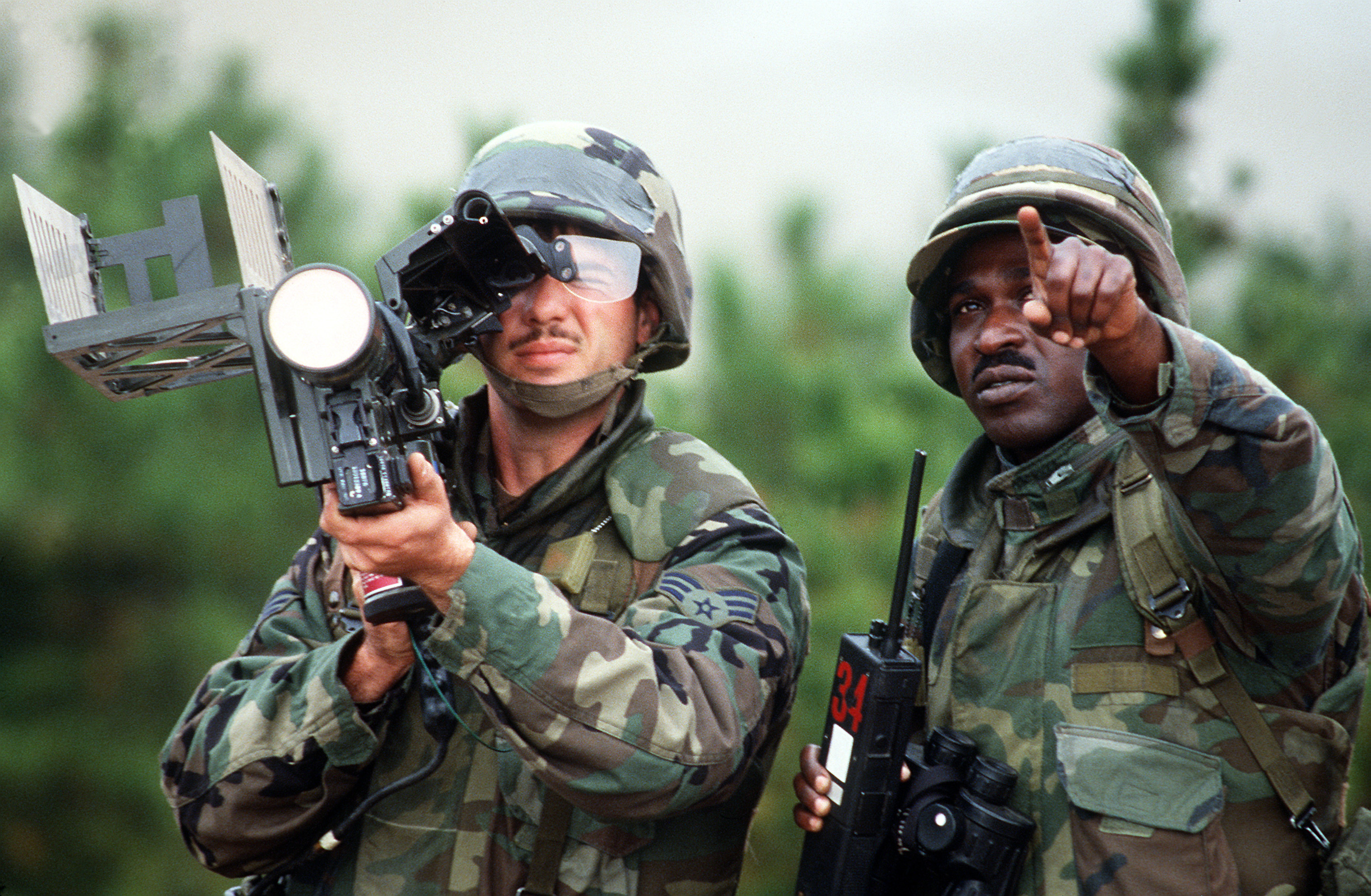
M134 Stinger Tracking Trainer with IFF antenna unfolded

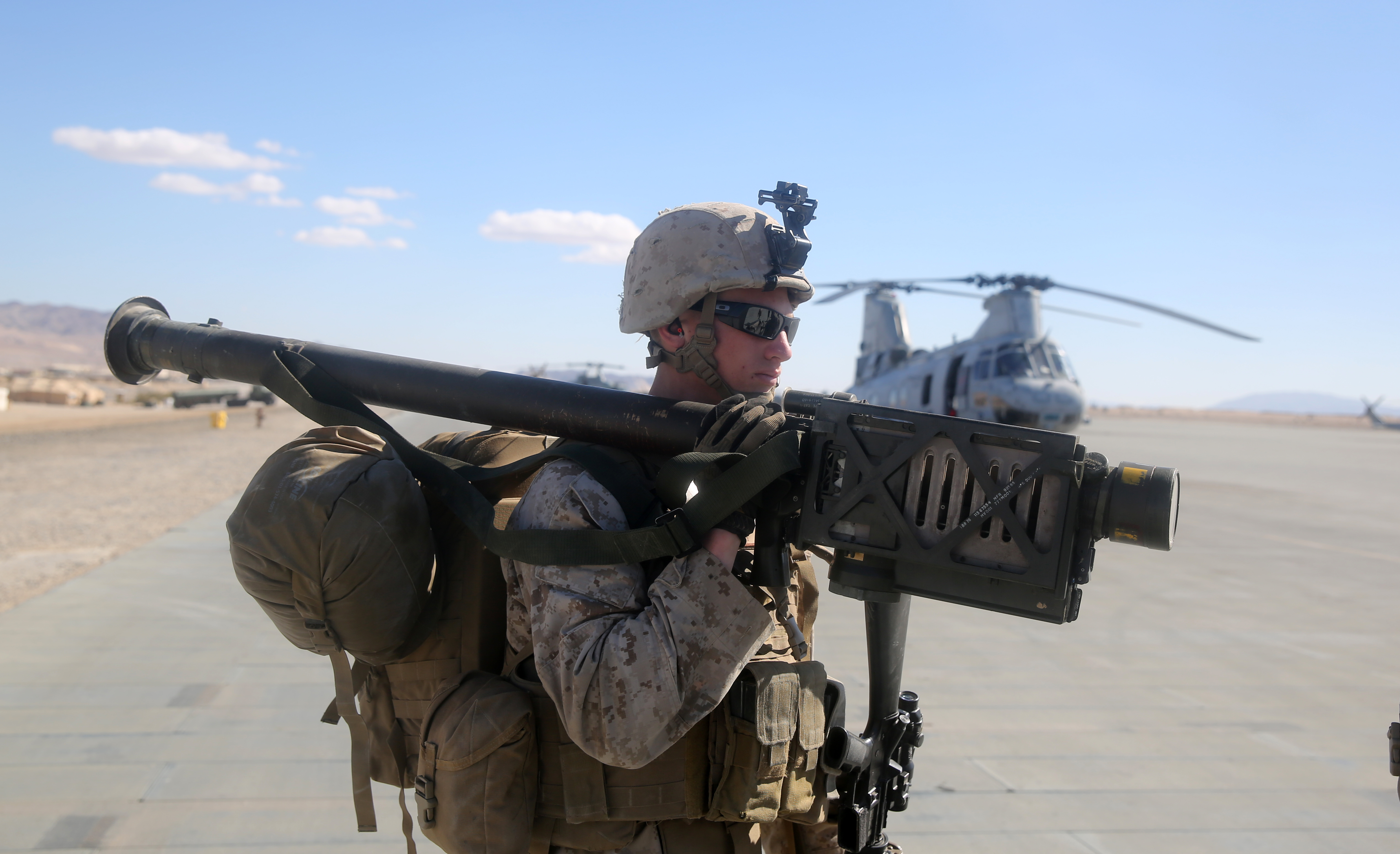
FIM-92 Stinger with IFF antenna folded

The missile is 5.0 ft (1.52 m) long and 2.8 in (70 mm) in diameter, with 3.9 in (100 mm) fins. The missile itself weighs 22 lb (10.1 kg), while the missile with its launch tube and integral sight, fitted with a gripstock and Identification Friend or Foe (IFF) antenna, weighs approximately 34 lb (15.2 kg). It has a targeting range of up to 3.0 miles (4,800 m) and can engage low-altitude enemy threats at up to 12,500 feet (3,800 m).

The Stinger is launched by a small ejection motor that pushes it a safe distance from the operator before engaging the main two-stage solid-fuel sustainer, which accelerates it to a maximum speed of Mach 2.54 (1,930 mph; 864 m/s). The warhead contains 2.25 lb (1.02 kg) of HTA-3 (a mix of HMX, TNT, and aluminium powder) explosive with an impact fuze and a self-destruct timer that functions 17 seconds after launch.

U.S. Marines with 2nd LAAD Bn conduct live fire with the FIM-92 Stinger at Marine Corps Base Camp Lejeune (2021)

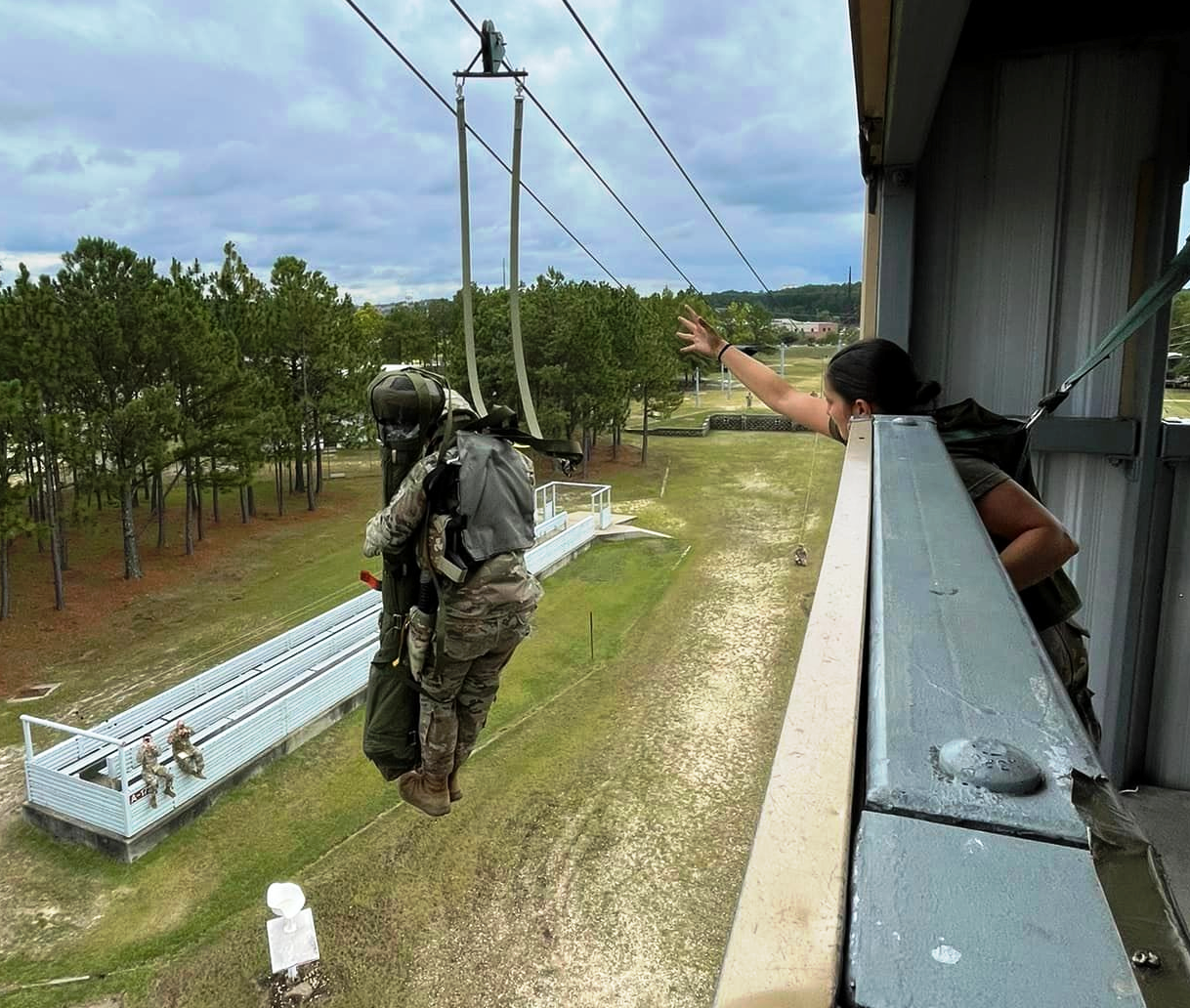
A paratrooper with 3rd Bn, 4th ADA Reg. practices parachuting techniques with the FIM-92 Stinger at Fort Bragg (2022)

To fire the missile, a BCU (Battery Coolant Unit) is inserted into the gripstock. This device consists of a supply of high-pressure gaseous argon, which is injected into the seeker to cryogenically cool it to operating temperature, and a thermal battery, which provides power for target acquisition: a single BCU provides power and coolant for roughly 45 seconds, after which another must be inserted if the missile has not been fired. The BCUs are somewhat sensitive to abuse and have a limited shelf life due to argon leakage. The IFF system receives power from a rechargeable battery, which is part of the IFF interrogator box, which plugs into the base of the gripstock's pistol grip. Guidance to the target is initially through proportional navigation, then switches to another mode that directs the missile towards the target airframe instead of its exhaust plume.

There are three main variants in use: the Stinger Basic, Stinger-Passive Optical Seeker Technique (POST), and Stinger-Reprogrammable Microprocessor (RMP). These correspond to the FIM-92A, FIM-92B, and FIM-92C and later variants respectively.

The POST and RMP variants have a dual-detector seeker: IR and UV. This allows it to distinguish targets from countermeasures much better than the Redeye and FIM-92A, which have IR-only. While modern flares can have an IR signature that is closely matched to the launching aircraft's engine exhaust, there is a readily distinguishable difference in UV signature between flares and jet engines. The Stinger-RMP is so-called because of its ability to load a new set of software via ROM chip inserted in the grip at the depot. If this download to the missile fails during power-up, basic functionality runs off the onboard ROM. The four-processor RMP has 4 KB of RAM for each processor. Since the downloaded code runs from RAM, there is little space to spare, particularly for processors dedicated to seeker input processing and target analysis.

== History ==
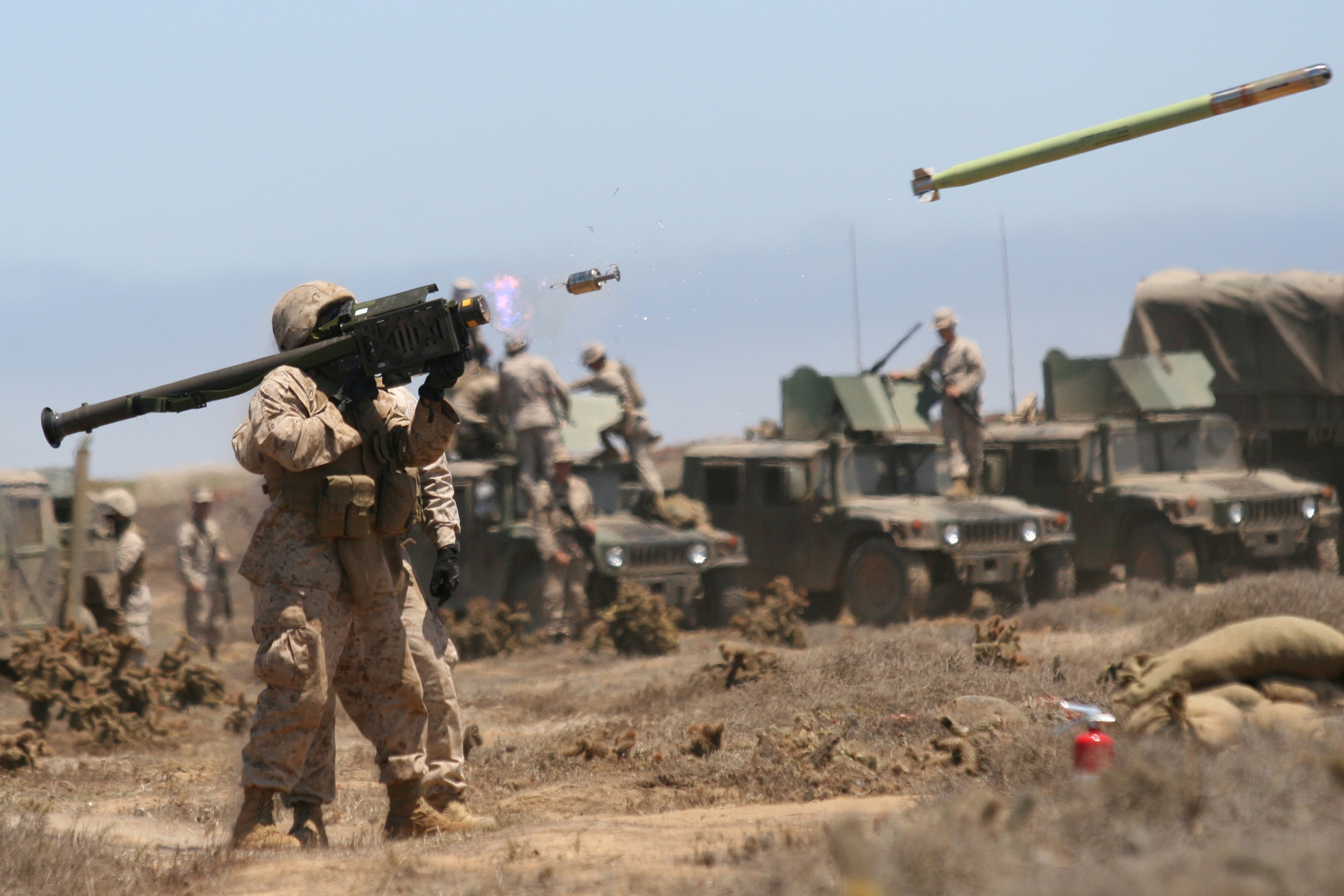
A U.S. Marine fires a FIM-92 Stinger missile during a July 2009 training exercise in California.

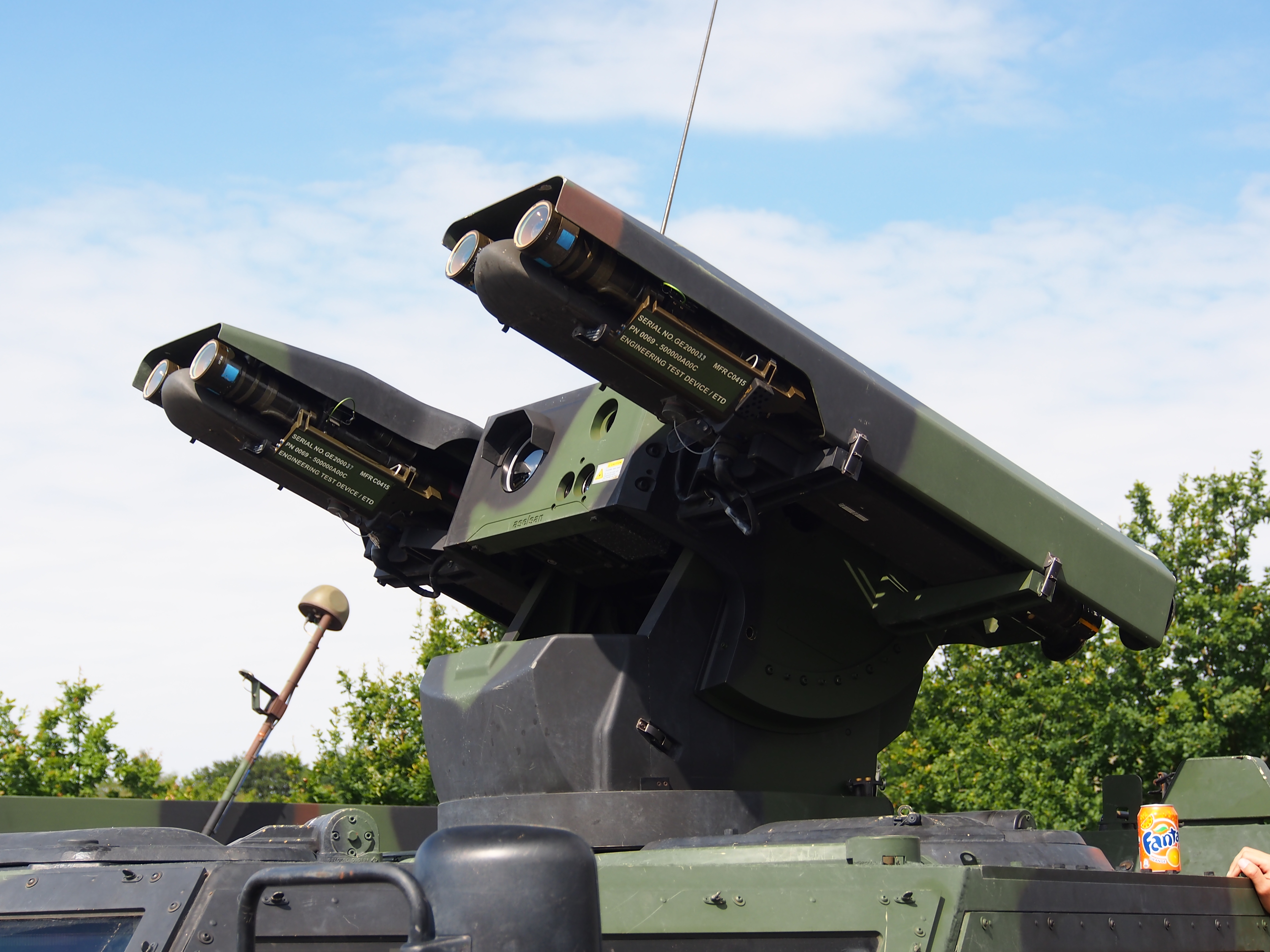
4 Stinger missiles on a Dutch Army Fennek reconnaissance vehicle.

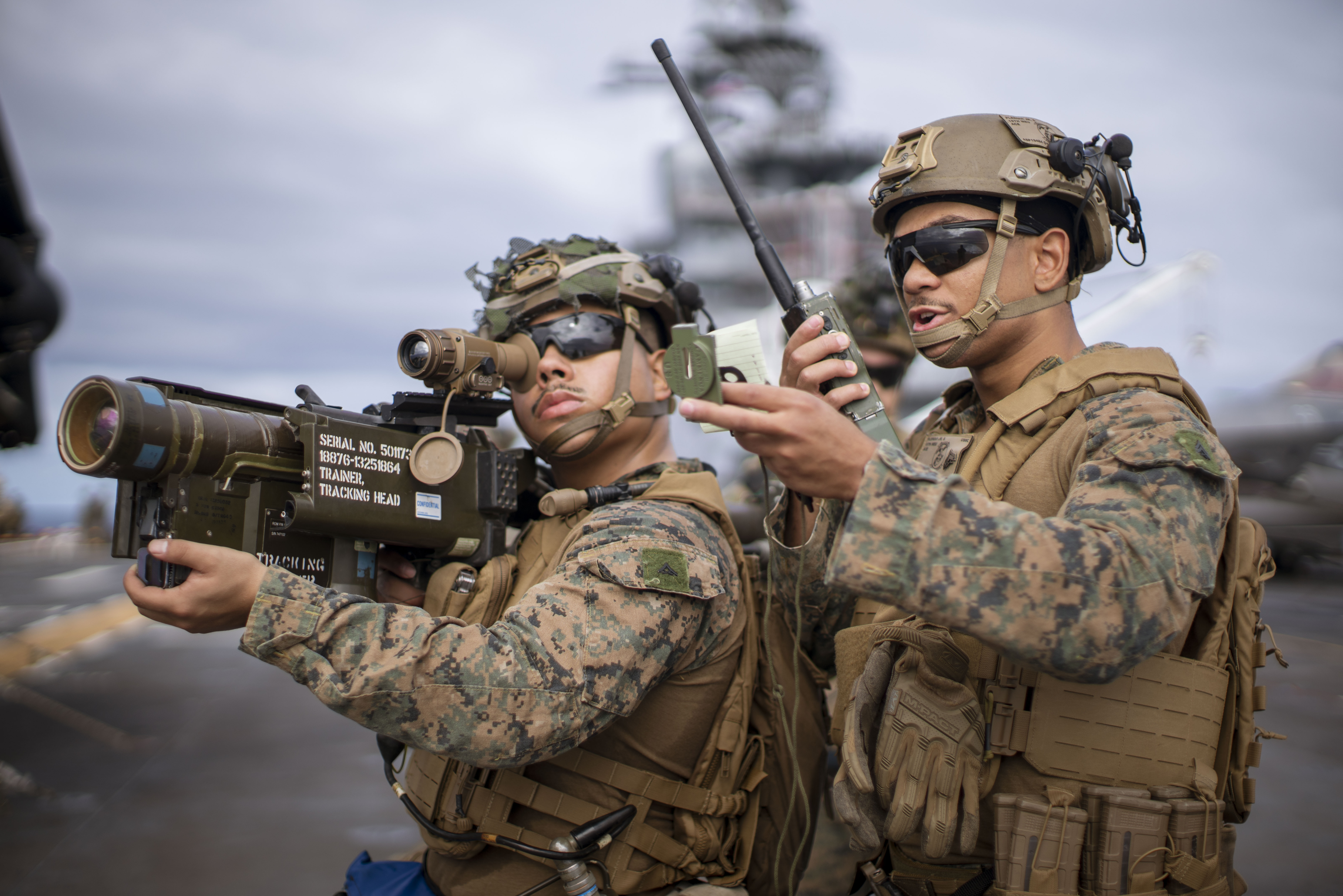
FIM-92 Stinger with the Family of Weapon Sights Individual (FWS-I) Thermal Sight

The missile began as a program by General Dynamics to produce an improved variant of their 1967 FIM-43 Redeye. Production of the Redeye ran from 1969 to 1982, with a total production of around 85,000 missiles. The program was accepted for further development as Redeye II by the U.S. Army in 1971 and designated FIM-92; the Stinger appellation was chosen in 1972. Because of technical difficulties that dogged testing, the first shoulder launch was not until mid-1975. Production of the FIM-92A began in 1978. An improved Stinger with a new seeker, the FIM-92B, was produced from 1983 alongside the FIM-92A. Production of both the A and B types ended in 1987 with around 16,000 missiles produced.

The replacement FIM-92C began development in 1984, and production began in 1987. The first examples were delivered to frontline units in 1989. C-type missiles were fitted with a reprogrammable microprocessor, allowing for incremental firmware updates. Later missiles designated D received improvements to improve their ability to defeat countermeasures, and later upgrades to the D were designated G.

The FIM-92E or Stinger RMP Block I was developed from 1992 and delivered from 1995 (certain sources state that the FIM-92D is also part of the Block I development). The main changes were again in the sensor and the software, improving the missile's performance against low-signature targets. A software upgrade in 2001 was designated FIM-92F. The development of the Stinger RMP Block II began in 1996 using a new focal plane array sensor to improve the missile's effectiveness in "high clutter" environments and increase the engagement range to about 4.72 mi (7,600 m). Production was scheduled for 2004, but was cancelled due to budget cuts.

Since 1984 the Stinger has been issued to many U.S. Navy warships for point defense, particularly in Middle Eastern waters, with a three-man team that can perform other duties when not conducting Stinger training or maintenance. Until it was decommissioned in September 1993, the U.S. Navy had at least one Stinger Gunnery Detachment attached to Beachmaster Unit Two in Little Creek Virginia. The sailors of this detachment would deploy to carrier battlegroups in teams of two to four sailors per ship as requested by Battle Group Commanders.

=== Replacement ===
The original Stinger's reprogrammable microprocessor has become obsolete in 2023, and a service life extension will keep the Block I in service until 2030. With the arsenal declining from obsolescence, on 10 November 2020 the U.S. Army issued a request for information for a replacement MANPADS. The new system will be compatible with the Stinger Vehicle Universal Launcher used on the IM-SHORAD and be able to defeat fixed and rotary-wing aircraft, as well as Group 2 and 3 UAS as well as or better than the Stinger. A contract for up to 8,000 missiles is planned to be awarded by 2026. The request for information to interested firms only went out in April 2022, and RTX and Lockheed Martin were selected to competitively develop the Stinger replacement in September 2023.

According to Reuters, the U.S. government has signed a contract for 1,468 Stingers worth a total of $687 million, to replenish stock sent to Ukraine. Raytheon Chief Executive Greg Hayes said on 26 April 2022: "Some of the components are no longer commercially available, and so we're going to have to go out and redesign some of the electronics in the missile of the seeker head. That's going to take us a little bit of time".

In January 2023, the U.S. Army said it expected to increase Stinger production to 60 missiles per month by 2025, an increase of 50% from the current rate. The Dual Detector Assembly (DDA) will be redesigned because a previous DDA part is no longer being made. The old DDA will continue to be used in production up until stocks are exhausted, which is expected by 2026 when deliveries of Stingers with the new component are expected to begin.

The U.S. Army Combat Capabilities Development Command Aviation & Missile Center (DEVCOM AvMC) launched the Red Wasp program, an advanced air defense interceptor initiative designed to enhance the capabilities of the long-serving FIM-92 Stinger missile. Red Wasp integrates solid fuel ramjet propulsion into the Stinger’s form factor to significantly increase its effective range. The system uses an integral rocket ramjet, a dual-mode propulsion cycle that begins with a conventional solid rocket motor to accelerate the missile to supersonic speeds. After burnout, a front-end port opens to allow air into the combustion chamber, where it ignites the ramjet fuel. This air-breathing phase eliminates the need for onboard oxidizers, improving fuel efficiency and overall performance. Red Wasp is intended to enable soldiers to engage Short Range Air Defense (SHORAD) threats such as unmanned aerial systems equipped with Intelligence, Surveillance, and Reconnaissance (ISR) capabilities at much longer distances, helping to deny adversarial targeting and increase force survivability. As ISR sensor technology advances and extends the effective range of enemy surveillance, Red Wasp offers a critical countermeasure by allowing U.S. forces to intercept threats at greater ranges. Following a successful 2024 flight test at Dugway Proving Ground, ongoing development is focused on refining ramjet fuel formulations and thermal insulation, with plans to collaborate with industry partners and scale the technology for broader Army applications.

== Variants ==
- Air-to-Air Stinger (ATAS): Used as short range air-to-air missile. The system is mainly designed for attack helicopters.
- FIM-92A: Stinger Basic: The basic model.
- FIM-92B: Stinger POST: In this version, the infrared seeker head was replaced by a combined IR/UV seeker that utilized rosette scanning. This resulted in achieving significantly higher resistance to enemy countermeasures (flares) and natural disturbances. Production ran from 1981 to 1987; a total of 600 missiles were produced.
- FIM-92C: Stinger RMP: The resistance to interference was increased again by adding more powerful digital computer components. Moreover, the software of the missile could now be reconfigured in a short time in order to respond quickly and efficiently to new types of countermeasures. Until 1991, some 20,000 units were produced for the U.S. Army alone.
- FIM-92D: Various modifications were continued with this version in order to increase the resistance to interference.
- FIM-92E: Stinger—RMP Block I: By adding a new rollover sensor and revised control software, the flight behavior was significantly improved. Additionally, the performance against small targets such as drones, cruise missiles and light reconnaissance helicopters was improved. The first deliveries began in 1995. Almost the entire stock of U.S. Stinger missiles was replaced by this version.
- FIM-92F: A further improvement of the E version and the current production version.
- FIM-92G: An unspecified upgrade for the D variant.
- FIM-92H: Indicates a D variant that has been upgraded to the E standard.
- Stinger—RMP Block II: This variant was a planned developed based on the E version. The improvements included an imaging infrared seeker head from the AIM-9X. With this modification, the detection distance and the resistance to jamming was to be greatly increased. Changes to the airframe would furthermore enable a significant increase in range. Although the missile reached the testing phase, the program was dropped in 2002 for budgetary reasons.
- FIM-92J: Block I missile upgrade to replace aging components to extend service life an additional 10 years. Upgrades include a proximity fuze warhead section, equipped with a target detection device to increase effectiveness against unmanned aerial vehicles, a new flight motor and gas generator cartridge, as well as new designs for the o-rings and integral desiccant cartridge.
- FIM-92K: Variant of FIM-92J designed to use a vehicle datalink rather than the missile's own seeker for targeting.
- ADSM: Air Defense Suppression Missile: Cancelled experiment variant fitted with a passive radar seeker, designed to be used against radar wave transmitters. The program began in FY 1983 and a final report was issued 3 December 1986.

== Service ==
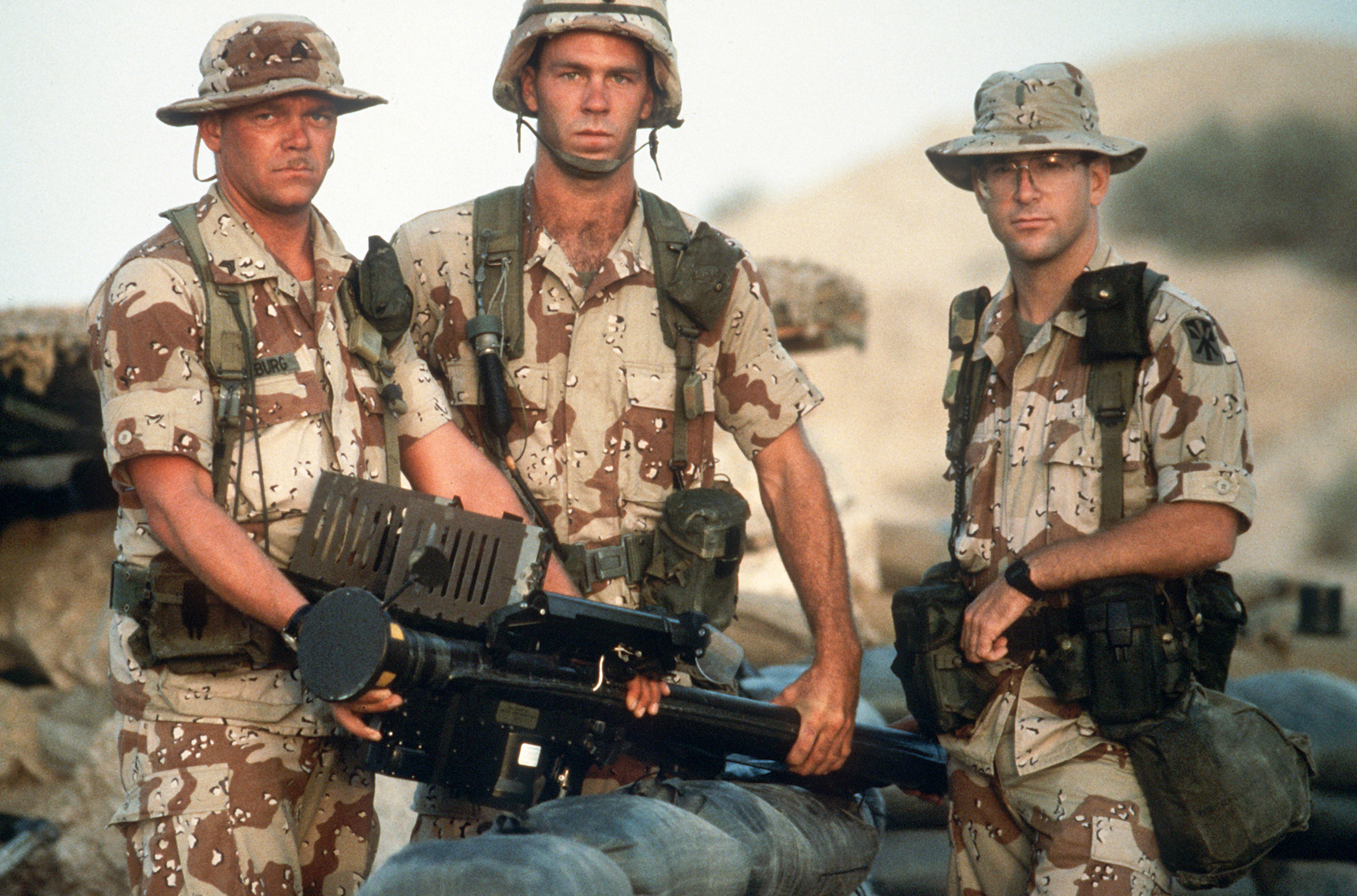
U.S. Army soldiers from the 11th Air Defense Artillery Brigade stand next to a FIM-92 Stinger portable missile launcher during the Persian Gulf War.

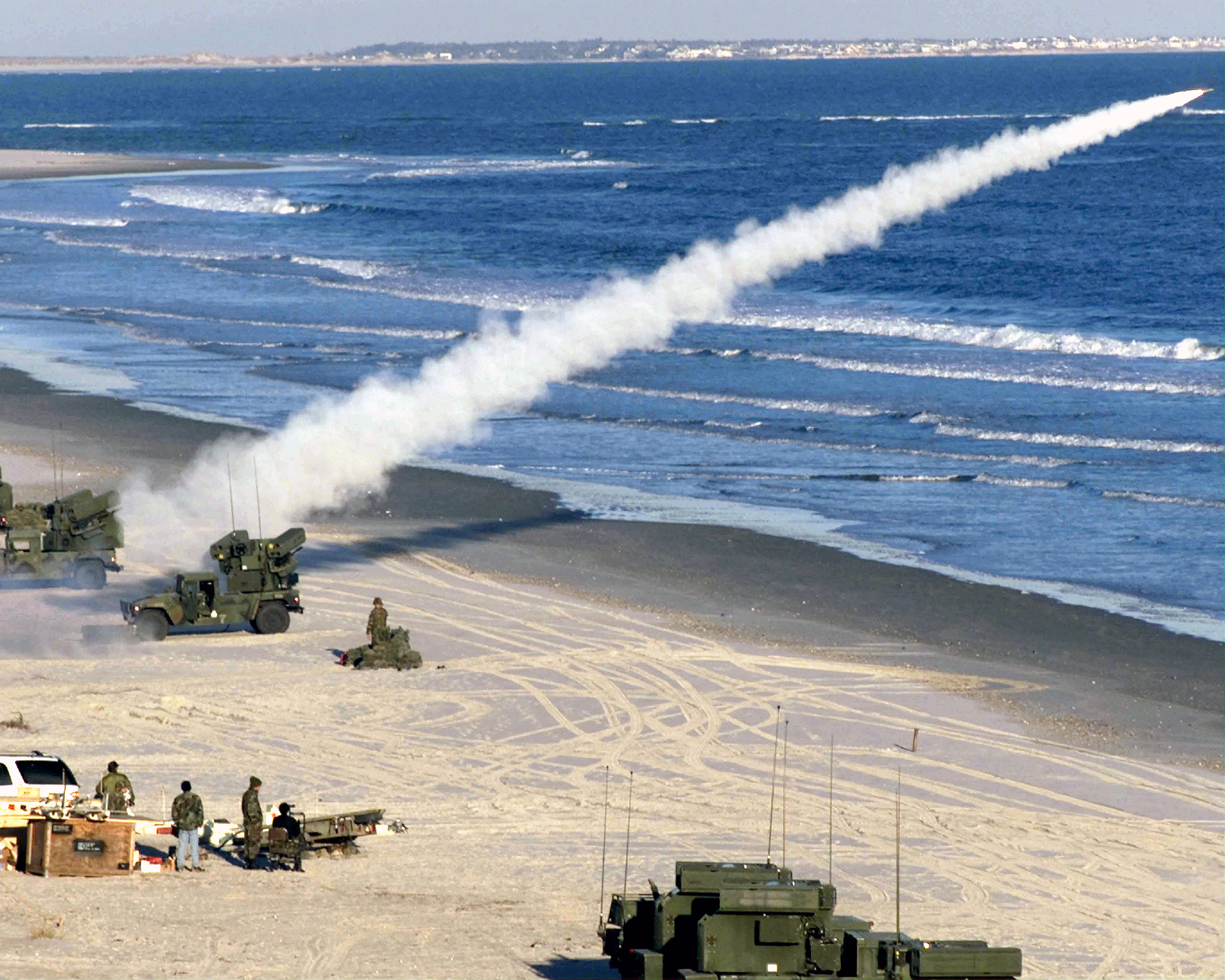
A Stinger missile being launched from a U.S. Marine Corps AN/TWQ-1 Avenger in April 2000.

=== Falklands War ===
The Stinger's combat debut occurred during the Falklands War (Spanish: Guerra de las Malvinas) fought between the United Kingdom and Argentina. At the onset of the conflict soldiers of the British Army's Special Air Service (SAS) had been clandestinely equipped with six missiles, although they had received little instruction in their use. The sole SAS trooper who had received training on the system, and was due to train other troops, was killed in a helicopter crash on 19 May.

Nonetheless, on 21 May 1982 an SAS soldier engaged and shot down an Argentine Pucará ground attack aircraft with a Stinger. On 30 May, at about 11:00 a.m., an Aérospatiale SA 330 Puma helicopter was brought down by another missile, also fired by the SAS, in the vicinity of Mount Kent. Six Argentine National Gendarmerie Special Forces troops were killed and eight more wounded.

The main MANPADS used by both sides during the Falklands War was the Blowpipe missile.

=== Soviet War in Afghanistan ===
In late 1985, several groups, such as Free the Eagle, began arguing the CIA was not doing enough to support the Mujahideen in the Soviet–Afghan War. Michael Pillsbury, Vincent Cannistraro, and others put enormous bureaucratic pressure on the CIA to provide the Stinger to the rebels. The idea was controversial because up to that point, the CIA had been operating with the pretense that the United States was not involved in the war directly, for various reasons. All weapons supplied up to that point were non-U.S. sourced weapons, including Kalashnikov style assault rifles made in China and Egypt.

The final say-so came down to President General Muhammad Zia-ul-Haq of Pakistan, through whom the CIA had to pass all of its funding and weapons to the Mujahideen. President Zia constantly had to gauge how much he could "make the pot boil" in Afghanistan without provoking a Soviet invasion of his own country. According to George Crile III, U.S. Representative Charlie Wilson's relationship with Zia was instrumental in the final go-ahead for the Stinger introduction.

Wilson and his associates at first viewed the Stinger as "just adding another component to the lethal mix we were building." Their increasingly successful Afghanistan strategy, formed largely by Michael G. Vickers, was based on a broad mix of weapons, tactics, and logistics, not a 'silver bullet solution' of a single weapon. Furthermore, the previous attempts to provide MANPADs to the Mujahideen, namely the SA-7 and Blowpipe, hadn't worked very well.

Another account came from Richard Clarke. In his book Against All Enemies, he, as a junior Deputy Assistant Secretary of State for Intelligence at the State Department, told his boss, Morton Abramowitz, they should release Stinger missiles to the Mujahideen. However, the CIA blocked it. Clarke was told to see his friend, Richard Perle who was then Assistant Secretary of Defense for Global Strategic Affairs. Perle didn't know about the CIA blocking the transfer and went to see Caspar Weinberger, the then United States Secretary of Defense who also didn't know CIA's move. Finally, the State and Defence Department and the United States National Security Council all in favour of arming the Mujahideen, the missiles were released. The condition via Perle was the Mujahideen had to be trained in Pakistan as no US Army personnel would enter Afghanistan.

Engineer Ghaffar, of Gulbuddin Hekmatyar's Hezb-i-Islami, brought down the first Hind gunship with a Stinger on 25 September 1986 near Jalalabad. As part of Operation Cyclone, the CIA eventually supplied nearly 500 Stingers (some sources claim 1,500–2,000) to the Mujahideen in Afghanistan, and 250 launchers.

The impact of the Stinger on the outcome of the war is contested, particularly in the translation between the impact on the tactical battlefield to the strategic level withdrawal, and the influence the first had on the second. Dr. Robert F. Baumann (of the Staff College at Fort Leavenworth) described its impact on "Soviet tactical operations" as "unmistakable". This opinion was shared by Yossef Bodansky. Soviet, and later, Russian, accounts give little significance to the Stinger for strategically ending the war.

According to the 1993 U.S. Air Defense Artillery Yearbook, the Mujahideen gunners used the supplied Stingers to score approximately 269 total aircraft kills in about 340 engagements, a 79% kill probability. If this report is accurate, Stingers would be responsible for over half of the 451 Soviet aircraft losses in Afghanistan. But these statistics are based on Mujahideen self-reporting, which is of unknown reliability. Selig Harrison rejects such figures, quoting a Russian general who claims the United States "greatly exaggerated" Soviet and Afghan aircraft losses during the war. According to Soviet figures, in 1987–1988, only 35 aircraft and 63 helicopters were destroyed by all causes. The Pakistan Army fired 28 Stingers at enemy aircraft with no kill. According to Soviet figures, by 25 December 1987, only 38 aircraft (airplanes, helicopters) were lost and 14 more were damaged by MANPADS (Blowpipe or Stinger), or 10.2% kill probability.

According to Crile, who includes information from Alexander Prokhanov, the Stinger was a "turning point". Milt Bearden saw it as a "force multiplier" and morale booster. Representative Charlie Wilson, the politician behind Operation Cyclone, described the first Stinger Mi-24 shootdowns in 1986 as one of the three crucial moments of his experience in the war, saying "we never really won a set-piece battle before September 26, and then we never lost one afterwards." He was given the first spent Stinger tube as a gift and kept it on his office wall. That launch tube is now on exhibit at the U.S. Army Air Defense Artillery Museum, Fort Sill, Oklahoma.

Other military analysts tend to be dismissive of the impact of the Stinger. According to Alan J. Kuperman, the Stingers did make an impact at first but within a few months flares, beacons, and exhaust baffles were installed to disorient the missiles, along with night operation and terrain-hugging tactics to prevent the rebels from getting a clear shot. By 1988, Kuperman states, the Mujahideen had all but stopped firing them. Another source (Jonathan Steele) states that Stingers forced Soviet helicopters and ground attack planes to bomb from higher altitudes with less accuracy, but did not bring down many more aircraft than Chinese heavy machine guns and other less sophisticated anti-aircraft weaponry.

The last Stingers were supplied in 1988 after increasing reports of fighters selling them to Iran and thawing relations with Moscow. After the 1989 Soviet withdrawal from Afghanistan, the U.S. attempted to buy back the Stinger missiles, with a $55 million program launched in 1990 to buy back around 300 missiles (US$183,300 each). The U.S. government collected most of the Stingers it had delivered, but by 1996 around 600 were unaccounted for and some found their way into Croatia, Iran, Sri Lanka, Qatar, and North Korea. According to the CIA, already in August 1988 the U.S. had demanded from Qatar the return of Stinger missiles. Wilson later told CBS he "lived in terror" that a civilian airliner would be shot down by a Stinger, but he did not have misgivings about having provided Stingers to defeat the Soviets.

The story of the Stingers in Afghanistan was popularly told in the media by Western sources primarily, notably in Charlie Wilson's War by George Crile, and Ghost Wars by Steve Coll.

=== Angolan civil war ===
The Reagan administration provided 310 Stingers to Jonas Savimbi's UNITA movement in Angola between 1986 and 1989. As in Afghanistan, efforts to recover missiles after the end of hostilities proved incomplete. The battery of a Stinger lasts for four or five years, so any battery supplied in the 1980s would now be inoperative but during the Syrian Civil War, insurgents showed how easily they switched to different batteries, including common car batteries, as power sources for several MANPADS models.

=== Libyan invasion of Chad ===
The French army used 15 firing positions and 30 missiles purchased in 1983 for operations in Chad. The 35th Parachute Artillery Regiment made an unsuccessful fire during a Libyan bombardment on 10 September 1987 and shot down a Hercules transport aircraft on 7 July 1988.

The Chadian government received Stinger missiles from the United States, when Libya invaded the northern part of the African country. On 8 October 1987, a Libyan Su-22MK was shot down by a FIM-92A fired by Chadian forces. The pilot, Capt. Diya al-Din, ejected and was captured. He was later granted political asylum by the French government. During the recovery operation, a Libyan MiG-23MS was shot down by a FIM-92A.

=== Tajik civil war ===
Tajik Islamist opposition forces operating from Afghanistan during the 1992–97 Tajik civil war encountered a heavy air campaign launched by Russia and Uzbekistan to prop up the government in Dushanbe that included border and cross-border raids. During one of these operations, a Sukhoi Su-24M was shot down on 3 May 1993 with a Stinger fired by the opposition. Both Russian pilots were rescued.

=== Chechen War ===
Russian officials claimed several times that the Chechen militia and insurgents possessed US-made Stinger missiles. They attributed a few of their aerial losses to the American MANPADS. The presence of such missiles was confirmed by photo evidence, and were said to originate from Afghan smuggling routes that passed through Georgia. It is believed one Sukhoi Su-24 was shot down by a Stinger missile during the Second Chechen War.

=== Sri Lankan civil war ===
The Liberation Tigers of Tamil Eelam also managed to acquire one or several Stingers, possibly from former Mujahideen stocks, and used at least one to down a Sri Lanka Air Force Mi-24 on 10 November 1997.

=== United States ===
In 2000, the U.S. inventory contained 13,400 missiles. The total cost of the program is $7,281,000,000. It is rumored that the United States Secret Service has Stinger missiles to defend the President, a notion that has never been dispelled; however, U.S. Secret Service plans favor moving the President to a safer place in the event of an attack rather than shooting down the plane, lest the missile (or the wreckage of the target aircraft) hit innocents.

During the 1980s, the Stinger was used to support different US-aligned guerrilla forces, notably the Afghan Mujahidins, the Chad government against the Libyan invasion and the Angolan UNITA. The Nicaraguan contras were not provided with Stingers due to the lack of fixed wing aircraft of the Sandinista government, as such the previous generation FIM-43 Redeye was considered adequate.

=== Syrian civil war ===
In the Syrian civil war, Turkey reportedly helped to transport a limited amount of FIM-92 Stingers to the Free Syrian Army.

On 27 February 2020, during the northwestern offensive launched in December 2019 by the Syrian regime (backed by Russia, Iran and Hezbollah), Russian and Syrian aircraft (variously reportedly as Russian Su-34s and Syrian Su-22) attacked a Turkish military convoy near Idlib, killing 36 Turkish soldiers. That day, video footage emerged of alleged Turkish soldiers (backing Syrian opposition fighters) firing what apparently looks like a Roketsan-made Stinger against either Russian or Syrian aircraft (or possibly against both).

=== Russo-Ukrainian War ===
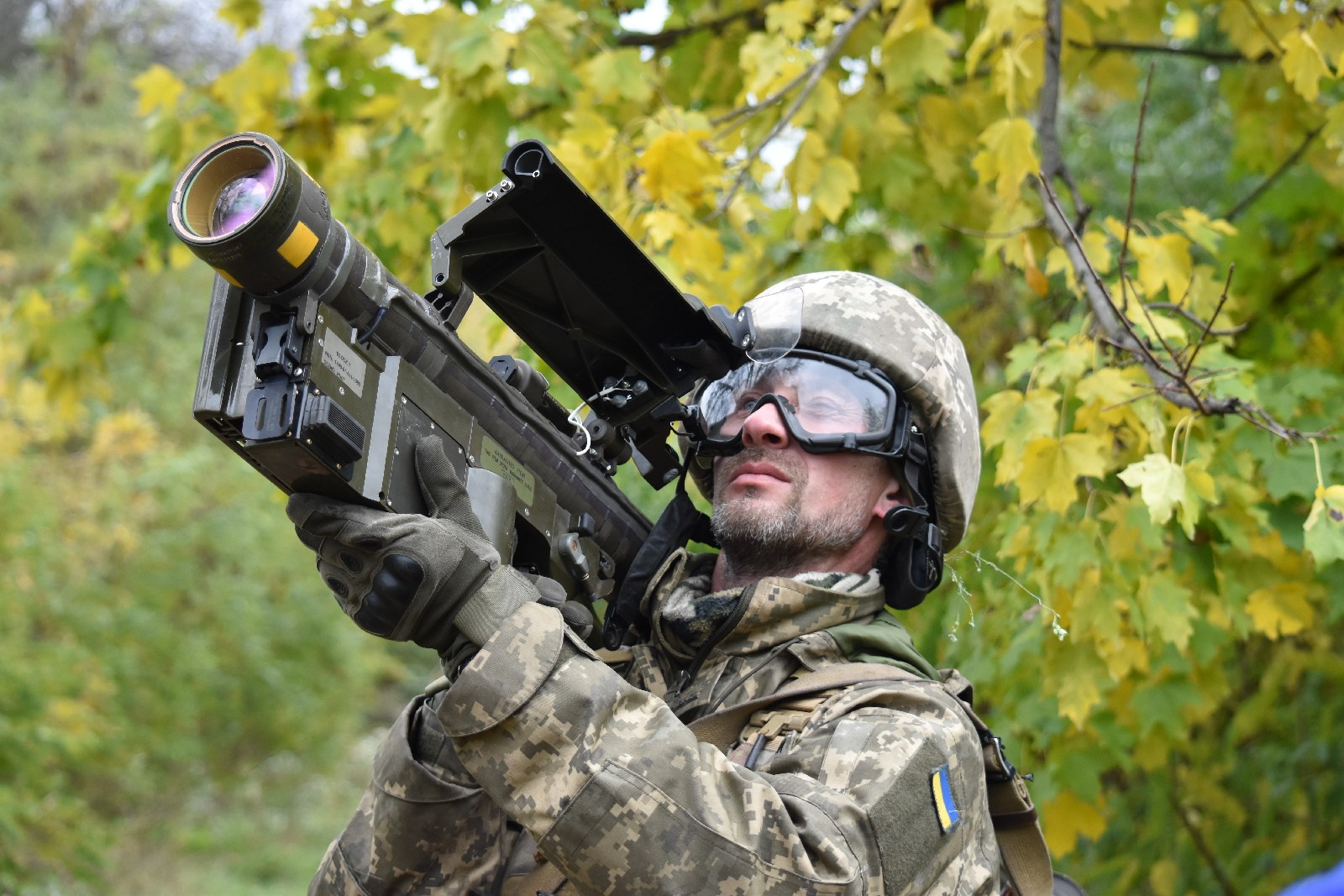
Ukrainian soldier of the 30th Mechanized Brigade Anti-Air Battalion with a FIM-92 Stinger during the Russian invasion of Ukraine

In February 2022, several countries announced that they were providing Stinger missiles to Ukrainian forces defending against the Russian invasion. Germany announced that it would provide 500 missiles. Denmark said that it will provide parts for 300 missiles, to be assembled in the United States. The Netherlands stated they would supply at least 200 units. Italy, Latvia, Lithuania, and the United States each stated that they would provide undisclosed amounts.

By 7 March, the U.S. reported that it and its NATO allies had together sent more than 2,000 Stinger missiles to Ukraine. In late April 2022, Raytheon Technologies CEO Greg Hayes told investors that the company was experiencing supply chain issues and would not be able to ramp up production of Stinger missiles until 2023. This delay was in part due to the fact the Stinger was scheduled to be replaced in the 2020s and thus contained obsolete components, which have to be redesigned for modern procurement. As of 11 May 2022, the U.S. had sent a quarter of its aging Stinger missile stockpile to Ukraine.

On 20 August 2022, Russia supplied a single Stinger to Iran, for them to attempt reverse engineering the modern version of it.

== Operators ==
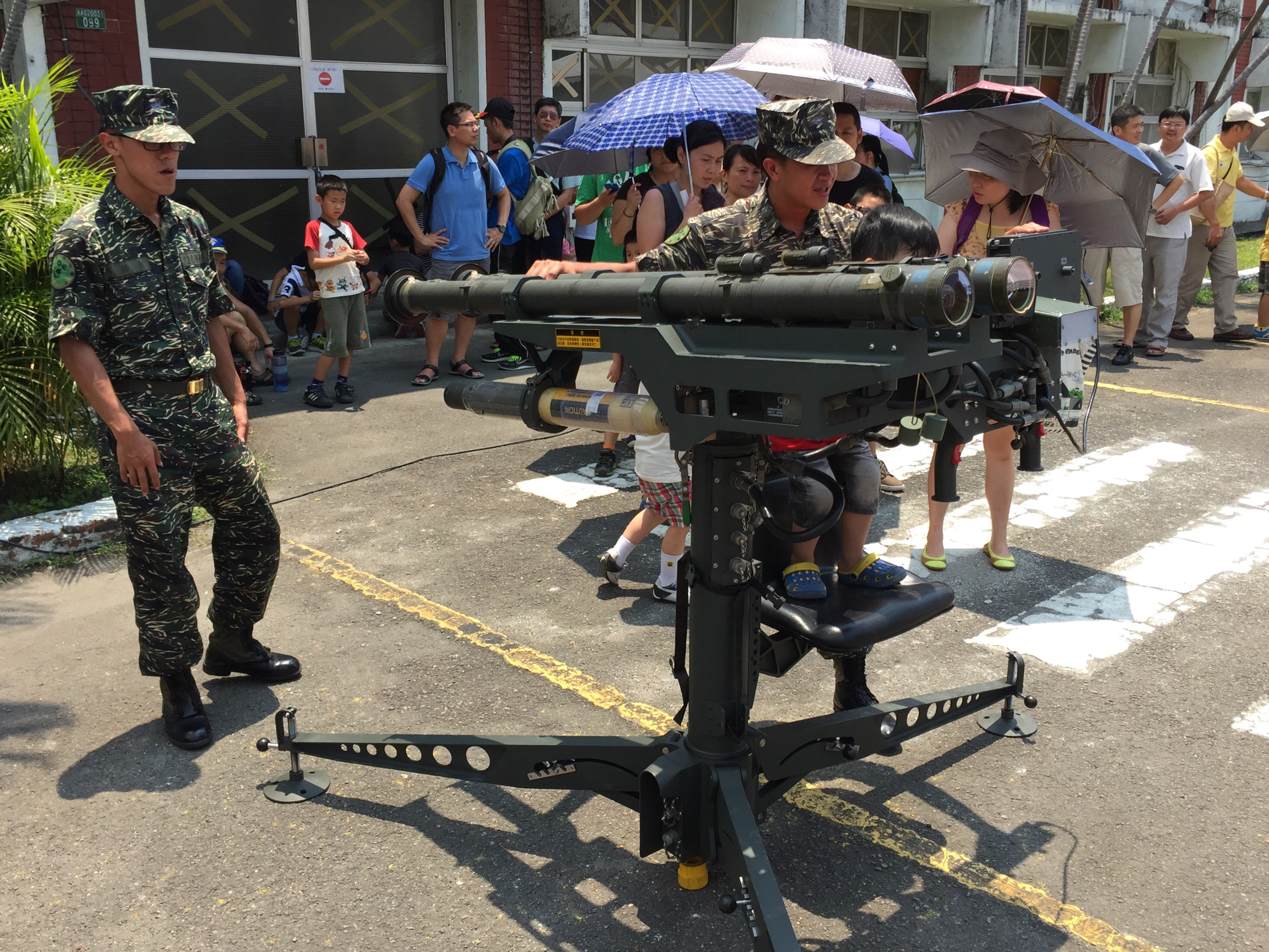
Taiwanese multiple Stinger missile launcher demonstration in Taipei's old Air Force base

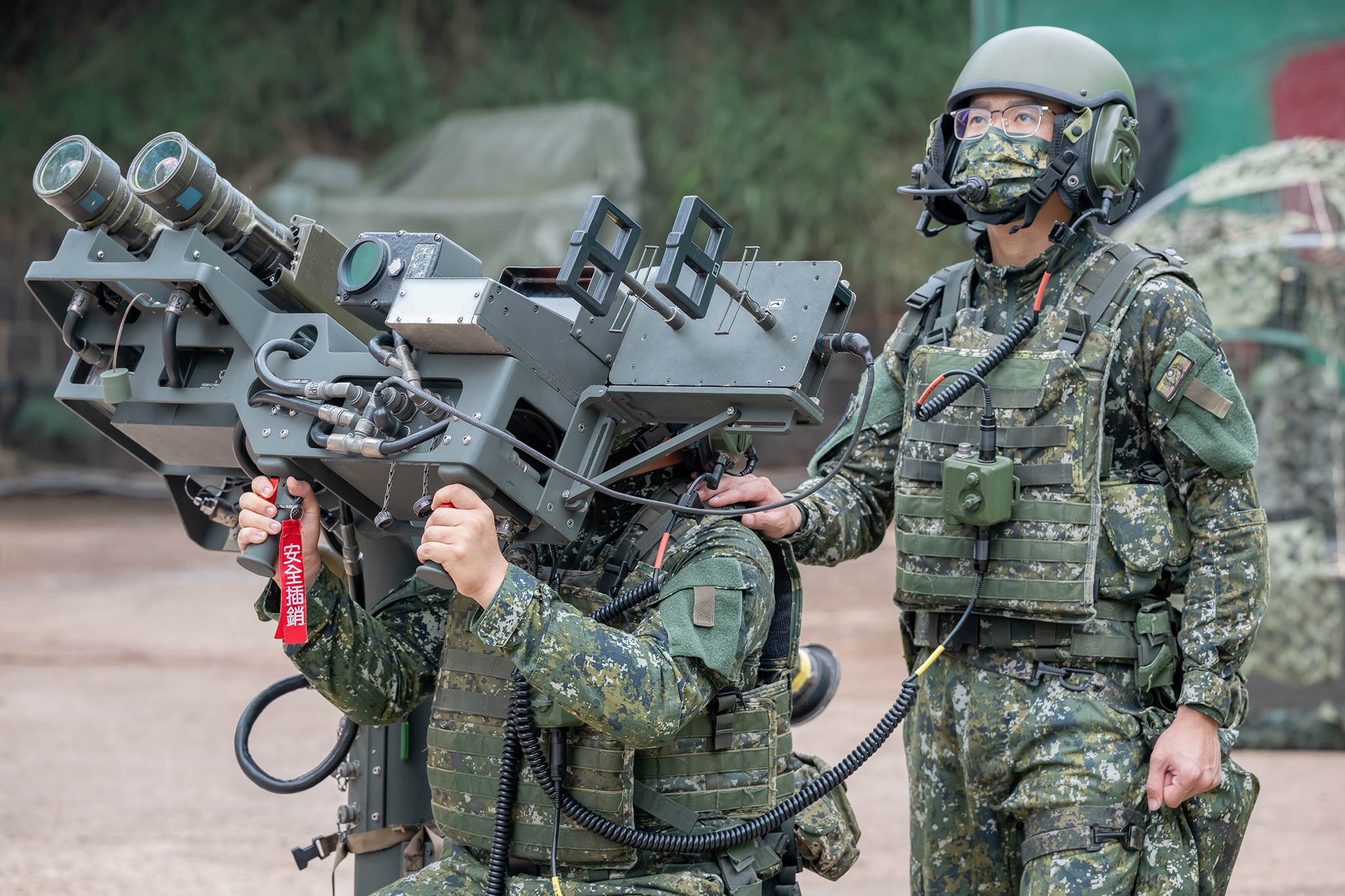
Multiple Stinger missile launcher demonstration on Penghu Defense Command Air Defense Company

=== Countries ===
- Albania: In May 2022, Minister Niko Peleshi announced the purchase of Javelin and Stinger missiles
- Afghanistan: used by Afghan Mujahideen.
- Angola
- Australia: formerly used by SASR in Afghanistan.
- Bahrain
- Bosnia and Herzegovina
- Chad: limited use.
- Chile
- Colombia
- Croatia
- Denmark
- Egypt
- Finland
- France
- Germany
- Greece
- India
- Iran
- Iraq
  - Kurdistan
- Israel
- Italy: Used by the Army and Marines.
- Japan
- Kuwait
- Latvia: Used by the Air Force.
- Lithuania: Used by the Air Force.
- Morocco: Part of a $4.25 billion AH-64E deal
- Netherlands: Used by the Army and Marines.
- North Korea
- Norway
- Pakistan: 350 in service with the Pakistan Army.
- Portugal: In 2021 Portuguese Army acquired new missiles and sights.
- Qatar: Used by the Air Force.
- Saudi Arabia
- Slovenia
- South Korea
- Switzerland
- Taiwan: Republic of China Navy, Republic of China Marine Corps, Republic of China Army
- Turkey: Stingers made under license by Roketsan. 4,800+ Stinger missiles were supplied under "Stinger Air Defense Guided Missile System European Common Production Program". Additional 1,000 Stinger needs were identified in July 2000 and the deliveries were completed in 2003.
- Ukraine: Lithuania and Latvia have transferred unknown quantities of Stinger missiles from their inventory to Ukraine after receiving an approval from the U.S. State Department. The Netherlands will supply Ukraine with 200 Stinger missiles. Germany will supply 500 Stingers. On 16 March 2022, the U.S. announced that an additional 800 Stinger missiles would be transferred, following an earlier transfer of over 600 missiles. Italy sent an undisclosed number of Stinger missiles since spring 2022.
- United Kingdom
- United States

=== Non-state users ===
- Islamic State
- UNITA

== See also ==
- 9K38 Igla – (Soviet Union)
- 9K333 Verba – (Russia)
- RBS 70 – (Sweden)
- Anza – (Pakistan)
- FN-6 – (China)
- Grom – (Poland)
- Misagh-2 – (Iran)
- Mistral – (France)
- Sungur – (Turkey)
- Piorun – (Poland)
- Qaem – (Iran)
- QW-1 Vanguard – (China)
- Type 91 surface-to-air missile – (Japan)
