= Bosnia and Herzegovina–Pakistan relations =

- Bosnia and Herzegovina: Pakistan

Bosnia and Herzegovina–Pakistan relations are the foreign relations between Pakistan and Bosnia. Pakistan recognised the independence of Bosnia from Yugoslavia in 1992, and the two established diplomatic relations. Bosnia has an embassy in Islamabad. Pakistan has an embassy in Sarajevo.

== High level visits ==
In 2016, Pakistan's Prime Minister Nawaz Sharif visited Bosnia on a 3-day visit and pledged support for the country.

== Bosnian War of Independence ==
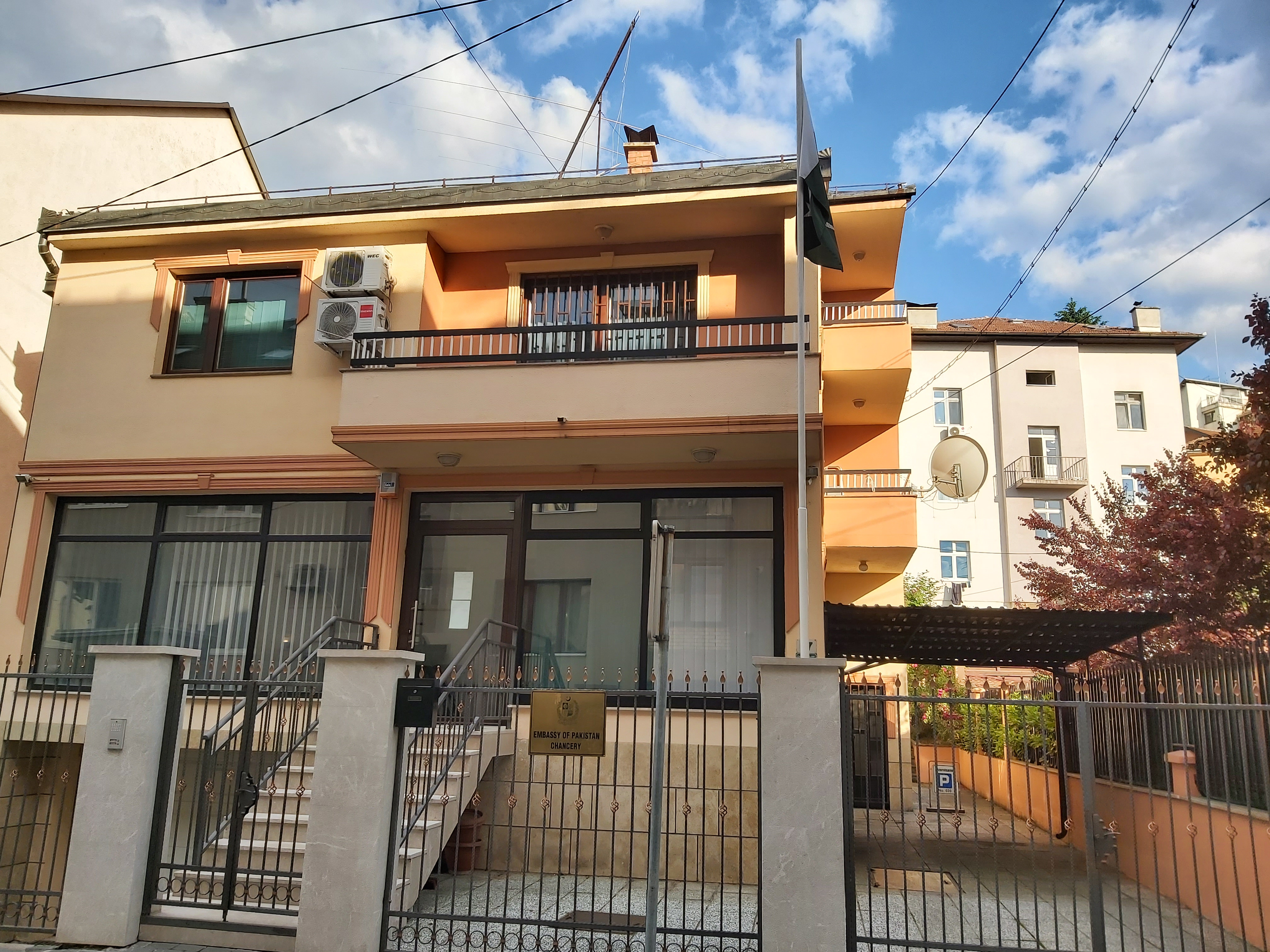
Embassy of Pakistan in Sarajevo

Pakistan sent UN Peacekeeping forces to the former Yugoslavia during the Yugoslav wars. During the war, Pakistan supported Bosnia while providing technical and military support to Bosnia. At the time Sadžida Silajdžić held the position of the ambassador of the Republic of Bosnia and Herzegovina in Islamabad, Pakistan.

== Free trade agreement ==
The two countries have a free trade agreement and are currently negotiating Preferential Trade Agreement (PTA). In 2012, the bilateral trade was $301,000. Much of the trade between the two is routed through some third country making products like surgical instruments, textile products, rice and lumber much more expensive.

== Defense cooperation ==
Pakistan has provided medium-tech to high tech weapons to the Bosnian Government in the past. Pakistan supports the aspiration causes of Sandžak Bosniaks as part of its geo-political understanding.Pakistan and Bosnia and Herzegovina signed MoU for defense cooperation in October 2012 during the visit of Bosnian President to Islamabad, the two countries vowed to boost their ties.

== Earthquake of 2005 ==
Donations from Bosnian schoolchildren and the government funded the building of a school and health centre in Azad Jammu and Kashmir (AJK) after the 2005 earthquake. The 2005 Kashmir earthquake occurred on October 8, 2005 and caused between 86,000 and 87,351 casualties and displaced 2.8 million people. The Ambassador of Bosnia and Herzegovina, Damir Dzanko, has said that his country will extend every possible support to AJK in the health and education sectors because of the unprecedented help and support extended by the government of Pakistan and its people during the Bosnian War.

== Bosnian refugees in Pakistan ==
Pakistan was the third Islamic country by numbers of Bosniak refugees, following Turkey and Jordan, during the Bosnian war. In June 1993, at least 380 Bosnian refugees had arrived in Pakistan, almost 200 of them children. Pakistan said at the time that it would accept some nine thousand additional refugees.

== Resident diplomatic missions ==
- Bosnia and Herzegovina has an embassy in Islamabad.
- Pakistan has an embassy in Sarajevo.

== See also ==
- Foreign relations of Bosnia and Herzegovina
- Foreign relations of Pakistan
- Pakistan–Yugoslavia relations
- Yugoslavia and the Non-Aligned Movement
