= CIA activities in Afghanistan =

The Afghanistan conflict began in 1978 and has coincided with several notable operations by the United States (U.S.) Central Intelligence Agency (CIA). Operation Cyclone, began in 1979 during the Jimmy Carter's presidency; it financed and later supplied weapons to the anti-Soviet Union mujahideen guerrillas in Afghanistan. This continued throughout the nearly ten-year Soviet occupation of Afghanistan, and under Carter's successor, Ronald Reagan.

Operation Cyclone primarily supported militant Islamist groups that were favored by Pakistani president Zia-ul-Haq's government, at the expense of other groups fighting the Soviet-aligned Democratic Republic of Afghanistan (DRA). To help the Pakistan's Inter-Services Intelligence (ISI), CIA funding disproportionately benefited Muslim Brotherhood-inspired mujahideen commanders like Gulbuddin Hekmatyar and Jalaluddin Haqqani; the CIA also developed a limited relationship with the more moderate Afghan commander Ahmad Shah Massoud beginning in 1984. Operation Cyclone was one of the longest and most expensive CIA operations ever undertaken. The Reagan administration rejected compromise with reformist Soviet leader Mikhail Gorbachev in favor of a total mujahideen victory. Funding continued until 1992 as the mujahideen battled the PDPA during the 1989–1992 civil war.

After the Soviet withdrawal from Afghanistan in 1989, the CIA's objective was to topple Mohammad Najibullah's government, which was formed under Soviet occupation. By 1990, the ISI and Hekmatyar were working to eliminate Massoud and their other rivals, in advance of the anticipated fall of the Afghan capital, Kabul. The ISI and CIA jointly formulated a plan to capture Jalalabad and Kabul during 1989–1990. Najibullah's government collapsed in 1992, following the Soviet Union's dissolution and the end of U.S. aid to the mujahideen, leaving Afghanistan a failed state in the grip of a multifaceted and destructive civil war. While some U.S. officials initially welcomed the emerging Taliban militia as it sought to restore order to Afghanistan, by the late 1990s, the U.S. became increasingly concerned about Pakistan's relationship with the Taliban, as the Taliban and its ally al-Qaeda became a more direct threat to the U.S..

In response to the September 11 attacks, CIA personnel coordinated closely with the anti-Taliban Northern Alliance during the 2001 U.S. invasion of Afghanistan. During the invasion, which was largely planned by the CIA, Osama bin Laden and other al-Qaeda leaders escaped to Pakistan. Throughout the war in Afghanistan (2001–2021), CIA-backed Afghan paramilitaries participated in numerous war crimes, most notably the Dasht-i-Leili massacre in 2001.

== 1979: Origins of the Afghanistan conflict ==
=== Intelligence analysis ===
The CIA National Foreign Assessment Center completed work on a report entitled "Afghanistan: Ethnic Divergence and Dissidence" in May 1979, although it was not formally published until March 1980. It is not known if the information was readily available to policymakers at the time of the December 1979 invasion.

According to this report, Pashtun tribal insurgency began in 1978, with the installation of a pro-Soviet government. The Pashtuns are devout Muslims and communist atheism is not in line with their strong Islamic beliefs. Furthermore, the historic preeminence of Pashtun politicians in Afghan politics since the 18th century served as a divisive issue that strengthened the resistance of the tribal groups. Ethnic solidarity among the Pashtun is strong compared to the Tajiks, who are the second largest ethnic group in Afghanistan.

=== Soviet invasion and U.S. response ===
Afghan communists under the leadership of Nur Muhammad Taraki seized power from Mohammed Daoud Khan in the Saur Revolution on 27 April 1978. The Soviet Union (U.S.S.R.) had previously invested in exporting communist ideology to Afghanistan and trained many of the army officers involved in Daoud's overthrow. Daoud had himself ousted King Mohammad Zahir Shah, ending more than two centuries of rule by the Afghan monarchy, five years earlier in the 1973 Afghan coup d'état. The newly formed Democratic Republic of Afghanistan (DRA)—which was divided between Taraki's extremist Khalq faction and the more moderate Parcham—signed a treaty of friendship with the U.S.S.R. in December 1978. Hundreds of Soviet advisors arrived in Afghanistan. Taraki's efforts to improve education and redistribute land were accompanied by mass executions (including of many conservative religious leaders) and political repression without precedent in Afghan history, igniting a revolt by mujahideen rebels.

The rebellion began to take shape with the March 1979 uprising in the western Afghan city of Herat, which has a relatively large Shi'ite population and deep ties to Iran (then in the throes of the Iranian Revolution); Iranian leader Ruhollah Khomeini's rhetoric along with the defection of Captain Ismail Khan from the DRA's armed forces inspired countless Afghans—Sunnis and Shi'ites alike—to violently resist secular change. The DRA's mass killing of up to 20,000 residents of Herat, followed by the Kerala massacre, failed to deter additional mutinies in Jalalabad and then across Afghanistan: By 1980, desertion had reduced the size of the Afghan army by considerably more than half.

After a general uprising in April 1979, Taraki was deposed by Khalq rival Hafizullah Amin in September. Amin was considered a "brutal psychopath" by foreign observers; even the Soviets were alarmed by the brutality of the Afghan communists, and suspected Amin of being an agent of the U.S. Central Intelligence Agency (CIA), although that was not the case. In reality, the CIA (which was blindsided by the 1978 coup) had little interest in or understanding of Afghanistan's internal politics at the time; its limited intelligence-gathering efforts in the country focused overwhelmingly on the Soviet presence, particularly with regard to Soviet military technology, and it was unwilling to expend considerable resources on recruiting Afghan communists. In December, citing concerns that Amin's government was losing control of the country, the U.S.S.R. invaded Afghanistan, assassinated Amin in a surprise attack, installed Parcham leader Babrak Karmal as the new Afghan leader, and oversaw a purge of Amin's supporters.

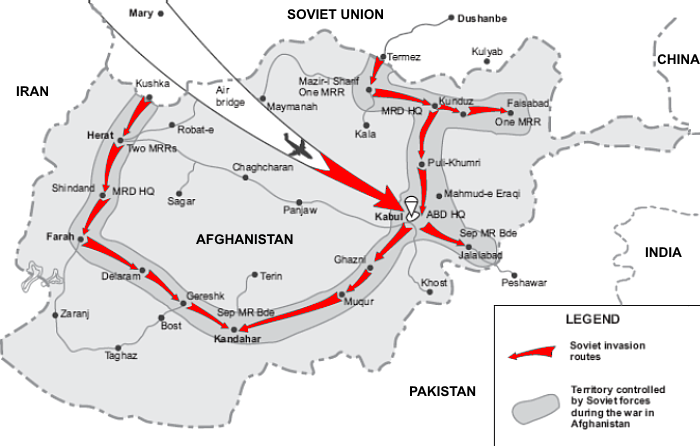
Map of Soviet movements in the 1979 Soviet invasion of Afghanistan

U.S. President Jimmy Carter expressed surprised at the invasion, as the consensus of the U.S. intelligence community during 1978 and 1979—reiterated as late as 29 September 1979—was that "Moscow would not intervene in force even if it appeared likely that the Khalq government was about to collapse." Indeed, Carter's diary entries from November 1979 until the Soviet invasion in late December contain only two short references to Afghanistan, and are instead preoccupied with the ongoing hostage crisis in Iran. However, while CIA analysts misjudged the likelihood of an invasion, the CIA carefully tracked Soviet military activities in and near Afghanistan, allowing it to accurately predict the Christmas Eve invasion on 22 December. In the West, the Soviet invasion of Afghanistan was considered a threat to global security and the oil supplies of the Persian Gulf. Moreover, the failure to accurately predict Soviet intentions caused American officials to reappraise the Soviet threat to both Iran and Pakistan, although it is now known that those fears were overblown. For example, U.S. intelligence closely followed Soviet exercises for an invasion of Iran throughout 1980, while an earlier warning from Carter's national security adviser (NSA) Zbigniew Brzezinski that "if the Soviets came to dominate Afghanistan, they could promote a separate Baluchistan ... [thus] dismembering Pakistan and Iran" took on new urgency. These concerns were a major factor in the unrequited efforts of both the Carter and Reagan administrations to improve relations with Iran, and resulted in massive aid to Pakistan's President Muhammad Zia-ul-Haq. President Zia's ties with the U.S. had been strained during Carter's presidency due to Pakistan's nuclear program and the execution of Zulfikar Ali Bhutto in April 1979, but Carter told Brzezinski and Secretary of State Cyrus Vance as early as January 1979 that it was vital to "repair our relationships with Pakistan" in light of unrest in Iran. One initiative Carter authorized to achieve this goal was a collaboration between the CIA and Pakistan's Inter-Services Intelligence (ISI); through the ISI, the CIA began providing $695,000 worth of non-lethal assistance (e.g., "cash, medical equipment, and radio transmitters") to the mujahideen on 3 July 1979—several months prior to the Soviet invasion. The modest scope of this early collaboration was likely influenced by the understanding, later recounted by senior CIA official Robert Gates, "that a substantial U.S. covert aid program" might have "raise[d] the stakes" thereby causing "the Soviets to intervene more directly and vigorously than otherwise intended." A 2020 review of declassified U.S. documents by Conor Tobin in the journal Diplomatic History found that "The small-scale covert program that developed in response to the increasing Soviet influence was part of a contingency plan if the Soviets did intervene militarily, as Washington would be in a better position to make it difficult for them to consolidate their position, but not designed to induce an intervention."

Although Director of Central Intelligence (DCI) Stansfield Turner and the CIA's Directorate of Operations (DO) were contemplating what Gates described as "several enhancement options"—up to and including the direct provision of arms from the U.S. to the mujahideen through the ISI—by October 1979, and an unnamed Brzezinski aide acknowledged in conversation with Selig S. Harrison that the U.S.'s nominally "non-lethal" assistance to the mujahideen included facilitating arms shipments by third-parties, Steve Coll, Harrison, Bruce Riedel, and the head of the DO's Near East–South Asia Division at the time—Charles Cogan—all state that no U.S.-supplied arms intended for the mujahideen reached Pakistan until January 1980, after Carter amended his presidential finding to include lethal provisions in late December 1979. Tobin reiterates that "no weapons were directly supplied before January 1980" but mentions that the United States National Security Council (NSC) agreed to explore additional ways to facilitate arms shipments to the mujahideen on 17 December—an idea rendered moot by the Soviet invasion one week later. Finally, on 28 December Carter signed a presidential finding explicitly allowing the CIA to transfer "lethal military equipment either directly or through third countries to the Afghan opponents of the Soviet intervention in Afghanistan," and to arrange "selective training, conducted outside of Afghanistan, in the use of such equipment either directly or via third country intermediation."

Coll describes Carter's December 1979 presidential finding:

In any event, policymakers back in Washington did not believe the Soviets could be defeated militarily by the rebels. The CIA's mission was spelled out in an amended Top Secret presidential finding signed by President Carter in late December 1979 and reauthorized by President Reagan in 1981. The finding permitted the CIA to ship weapons secretly to the mujahedin. The document used the word harassment to describe the CIA's goals against Soviet forces. The CIA's covert action was to raise the cost of Soviet intervention in Afghanistan. It might also deter the Soviets from undertaking other Third World invasions. But this was not a war the CIA expected to win outright on the battlefield. The finding made clear that the agency was to work through Pakistan and defer to Pakistani priorities. The CIA's Afghan program would not be "unilateral," as the agency called operations it ran in secret on its own. Instead the CIA would emphasize "liaison" with Pakistani intelligence. The first guns shipped in were single-shot, bolt-action .303 Lee Enfield rifles, a standard British infantry weapon until the 1950s. With its heavy wooden stock and antique design, it was not an especially exciting weapon, but it was accurate and powerful.

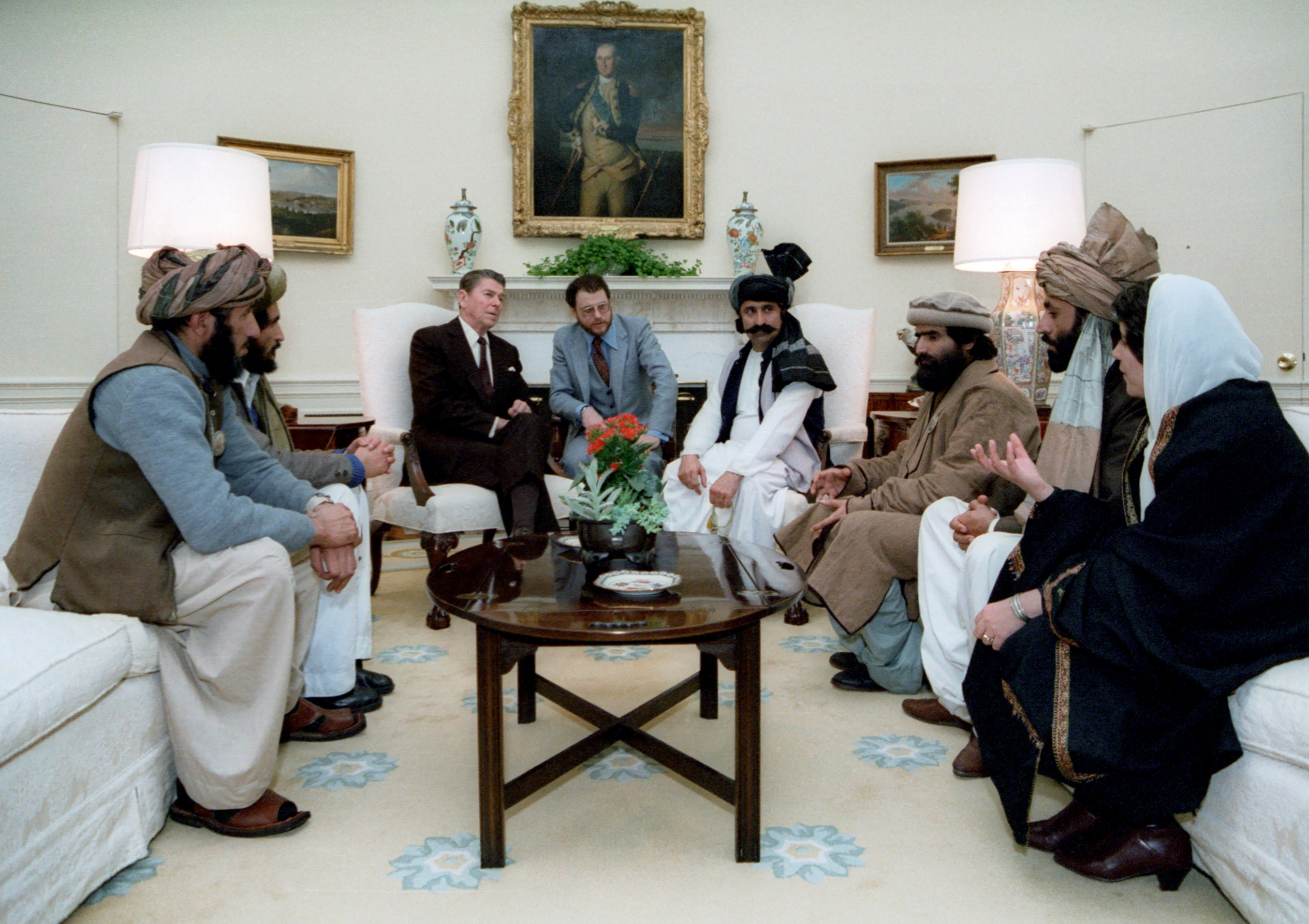
U.S. president Ronald Reagan meeting with Afghan mujahideen leaders in the Oval Office in 1983

In the aftermath of the invasion, Carter was determined to respond vigorously to what he considered a dangerous provocation. In a televised speech, he announced sanctions on the U.S.S.R., promised renewed aid to Pakistan, and committed the U.S. to the Persian Gulf's defense. Carter also called for a boycott of the 1980 Summer Olympics in Moscow, which raised a bitter controversy. British prime minister Margaret Thatcher enthusiastically backed Carter's tough stance, although British intelligence believed "the CIA was being too alarmist about the Soviet threat to Pakistan." The thrust of U.S. policy for the duration of the war was determined by Carter in early 1980: Carter initiated a program to arm the mujahideen through Pakistan's ISI and secured a pledge from Saudi Arabia to match U.S. funding for this purpose. U.S. support for the mujahideen accelerated under Carter's successor, Ronald Reagan, at a final cost to U.S. taxpayers of some $3 billion (per Riedel, based on congressional appropriations). The Soviets were unable to quell the insurgency and withdrew from Afghanistan in 1989, precipitating the dissolution of the Soviet Union itself. Of the seven mujahideen groups supported by Zia's government, four espoused Islamic fundamentalist beliefs—and these fundamentalists received most of the funding.

By 1992, the combined U.S., Saudi, and Chinese aid to the mujahideen was estimated at $6–12 billion, whereas Soviet military aid to Afghanistan was valued at $36–48 billion. The result was a heavily armed, militarized Afghan society: Some sources indicate that Afghanistan was the world's top destination for personal weapons during the 1980s. Some 1.5 million Afghans died as a result of warfare between 1979 and 1996.

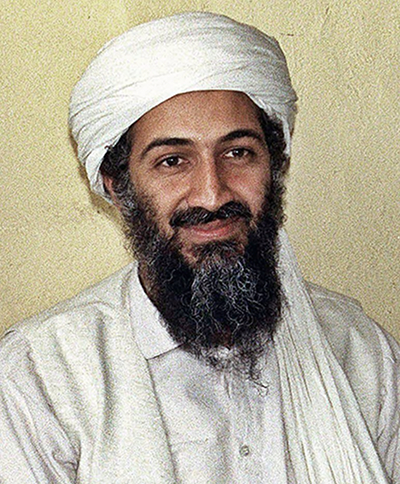
Osama bin Laden

There are allegations that Osama bin Laden and al-Qaeda were beneficiaries of CIA assistance. This is contradicted by journalists such as Coll—who notes that declassified CIA records and interviews with CIA officers do not support such claims—and more forcefully by Peter Bergen, who concludes: "The theory that bin Laden was created by the CIA is invariably advanced as an axiom with no supporting evidence." According to them, U.S. funding went exclusively to the Afghan mujahideen fighters, not the Arab volunteers who arrived to assist them. Yet Coll also documents that bin Laden at least informally cooperated with the ISI and with Saudi intelligence during the 1980s and had intimate connections to CIA-backed mujahideen commander Jalaluddin Haqqani; Milton Bearden, the CIA's Islamabad station chief from mid-1986 until mid-1989, took an admiring view of bin Laden at the time. Afghan assets recounted the fanaticism and intolerance of many of the so-called "Afghan Arabs" to the CIA, yet the CIA discounted these reports, instead contemplating direct support to the Arab volunteers under the guise of a Spanish Civil War-inspired "international brigade"—a concept that never got off paper. Coll writes that Haqqani and his brothers, who were given hundreds of thousands of dollars in direct cash payments by their CIA case officer, "did more than any other commander network in Afghanistan to nurture and support Arab volunteer fighters, seeding al-Qaeda's birth."

== 1980 ==
=== Intelligence analysis ===
A memorandum spoke of continued tribal rivalries as adding to the resistance to the Soviets.

23 September 1980, the intelligence community at the Southwest Asia Analyst Center, Office of Political Analysts Intelligence created a report on Afghanistan's power structures and tribal affiliations. The report reveals there were hundreds of tribes and more than a dozen ethnic groups in Afghanistan, focusing on power structures and loyalties. Other significant sections includes a detail that those who clung closely to traditional tribal ways were least likely to be swayed by communism and that traditional beliefs include dedication to revenge, masculine superiority, emphasis on bravery and honor, and suspicion of outsiders. The reports states: "Any change in the traditional way of life is considered wrong, and modern ideas—whether communist or western—are seen as a threat."

== 1985: Escalation ==
=== NSDD–166 ===
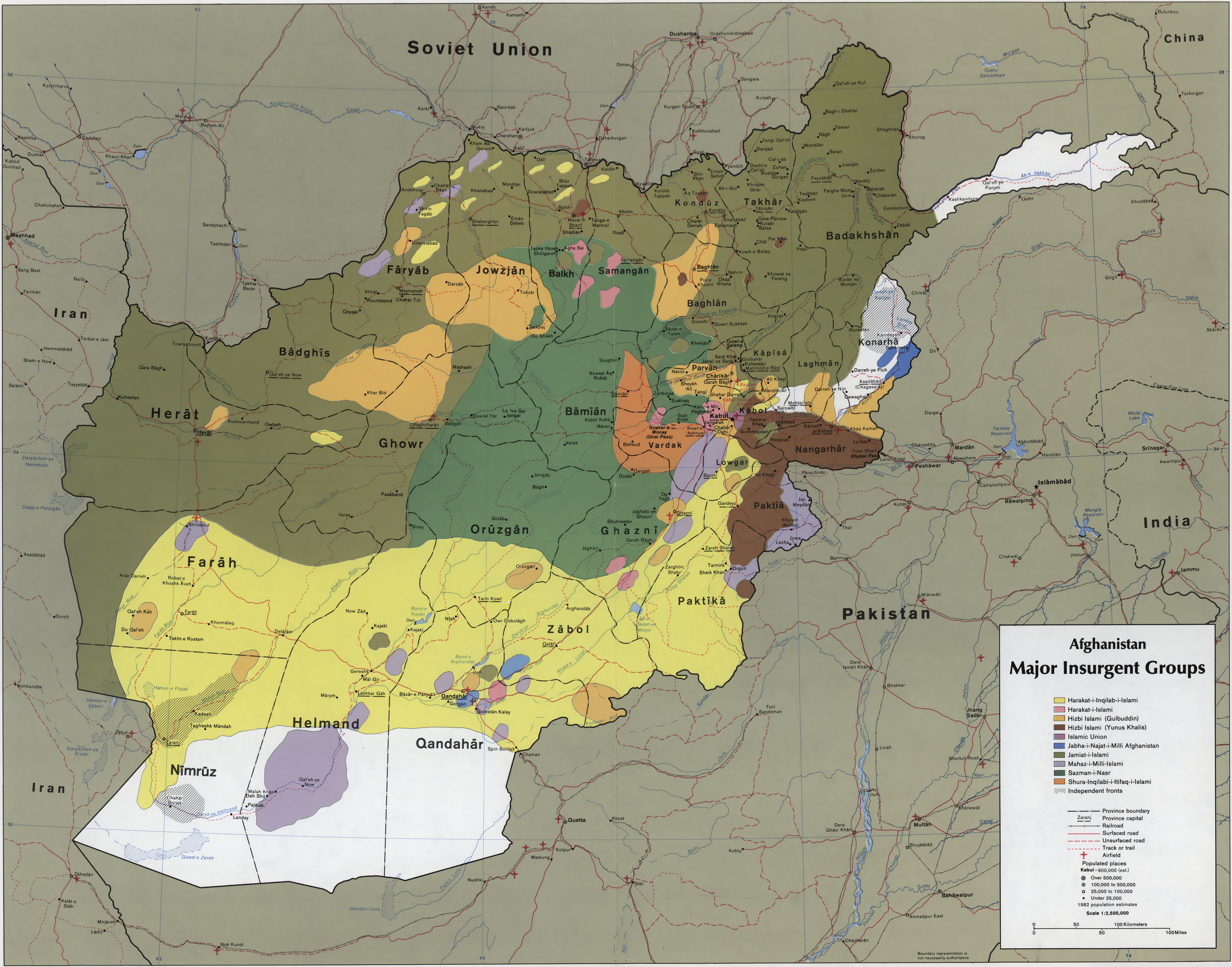
Major Afghan mujahideen groups in 1985

Largely as a result of lobbying by ideological conservatives and Democratic representative Charlie Wilson, the fiscal year beginning in October 1984 coincided with a large increase in funding and, ultimately, in the scale of the CIA's activities in Afghanistan. An agreement between Wilson, DCI William J. Casey, and the Defense Department permitted congressional hardliners, with Wilson in the lead, to transfer tens of millions in unspent congressional funds originally allocated for the U.S. military to the CIA's Afghan program each year, notwithstanding the preference of many career CIA officials (including Cogan and Casey's deputy director John N. McMahon) for a smaller program. Congressional funding for fiscal 1985 (not even including matching funds from Saudi intelligence) reached $250 million, which was almost the same as the total amount previously spent on aid to the mujahideen. This funding surge led Casey to call for a reassessment of the CIA's role in Afghanistan. Casey wrote in December 1984: "In the long run, merely increasing the costs to the Soviets of an Afghan incursion, which is basically how we have been justifying the activity when asked, is not likely to fly."

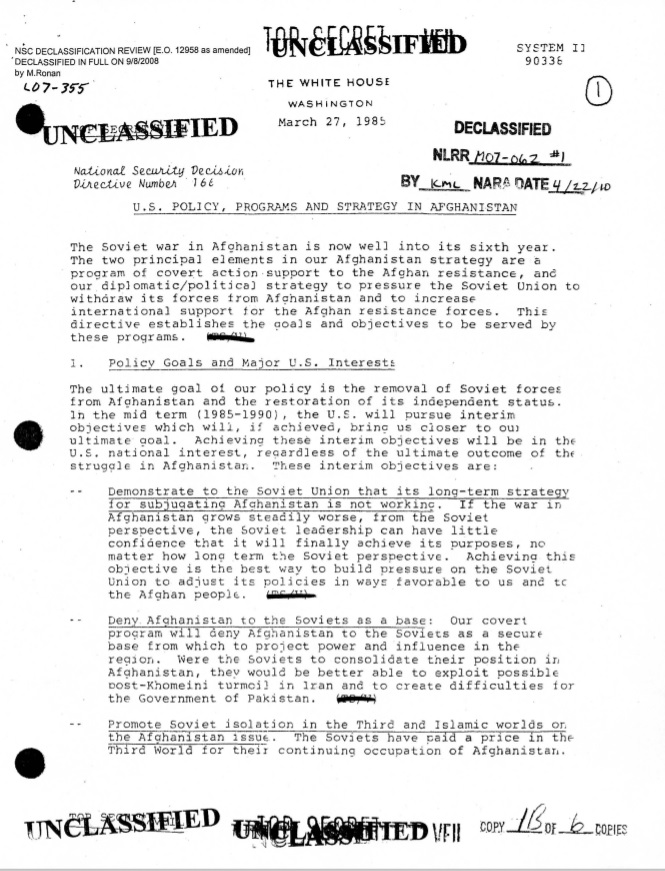
NSDD-166 changed objectives for the covert program

Following an interagency review of Afghan policy overseen by the NSC and including representatives from the State Department and Defense Department in addition to the CIA, in March 1985 President Reagan signed a draft of a National Security Decision Directive (NSDD) that was pushed for by Fred Iklé and especially the arch-conservative Michael Pillsbury at the Defense Department, which formalized and provided a legal rationale for the changes that were already taking place with regard to CIA activities in Afghanistan. The resulting NSDD–166 reportedly included a highly classified supplement signed by NSA Robert McFarlane that detailed expanded forms of U.S. assistance to the mujahideen, such as the provision of satellite intelligence, "burst communication" devices, advanced weapons systems, and additional training to the Afghan rebels through the ISI. Furthermore, the document allowed the CIA to unilaterally support certain Afghan assets without the ISI's participation or knowledge. In sum, NSDD–166 defined the Reagan administration's policy as aiding the mujahideen by "all available means." In an 30 April meeting, Iklé communicated the general thrust of this policy to ISI Director Akhtar Abdur Rahman. Vastly more Americans arrived in Pakistan to train ISI handlers on the new weapons systems. In turn, the ISI developed a complex infrastructure that was training 16,000 to 18,000 Afghan mujahideen annually by early 1986, with ISI chief of Afghan operations Mohammed Yousaf estimating that a further 6,000 to 7,000 rebels (including a number of Arab volunteers) were trained every year by mujahideen that had previously been recipients of ISI instruction. Although the CIA was theoretically empowered to act more independently of the ISI and took some steps to "audit" the ISI's handling of American resources in response to congressional concerns about fraud, the ISI remained the main conduit for U.S. support to the mujahideen and the bulk of the Reagan-era aid championed by conservatives went to Muslim Brotherhood-inspired commanders favored by the ISI, most notably Gulbuddin Hekmatyar.

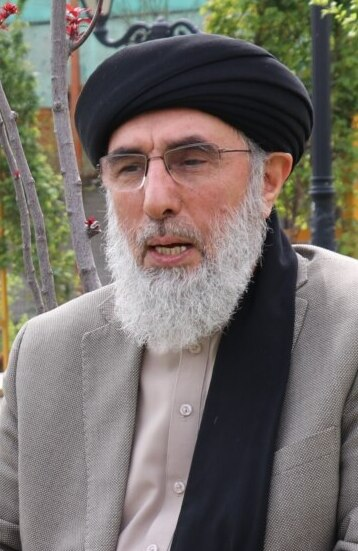
Gulbuddin Hekmatyar

There were discussions within the U.S. government regarding the connection between the CIA's support for an Afghan insurgency that was actively killing Soviet troops and the legal rule prohibiting employees of the U.S. government from engaging in assassination. Casey asked rhetorically: "Every time a mujahedin rebel kills a Soviet rifleman, are we engaged in assassination?" On paper, the CIA's lack of command and control over the mujahideen insulated it from charges of assassination; in practice, however, there were ambiguities. Among many other examples, the CIA's Islamabad station chief from May 1981 to mid-1984, Howard Hart, previously called for a Pakistani bounty on killed or captured Soviet troops; Gust Avrakotos, serving as the head of the CIA's task force on Afghan operations, praised a Pakistani program that provided incentives to mujahideen commanders based on the volume of captured Soviet belt buckles they turned in; the ISI organized repeated unsuccessful assassination attempts on Mohammad Najibullah, then in charge of Afghanistan's KHAD secret police (and later the President of Afghanistan), using CIA funds; and CIA-supplied long-range rockets (originally of Chinese or Egyptian origin) killed and maimed countless civilians during the bombardment of Kabul from 1985 on. Ultimately, the CIA had no way to know with certainty how any weapon that it supplied would be used on the battlefield, but it generally refrained from providing a weapon if a determination was made that the weapon's primary purpose was more likely than not to be assassination, terrorism, or other unlawful conduct. This "most likely use" standard had no bearing on so-called "dual-use" weapons that could plausibly serve a legitimate military purpose and were shipped to Pakistan under the auspices of NSDD–166—such as tons of C-4 explosives, thousands of timed detonators, and dozens of sniper rifles—but in a concession to its in-house legal advisors the CIA declined to provide night vision technology or satellite intelligence on the apartment residences of Soviet military officers along with the sniper rifles. Several years later the U.S. was compelled by ISI activities in the disputed territory to warn Indian officials in Kashmir to take protective measures against the long-range rifles.

=== Cross-border activities ===
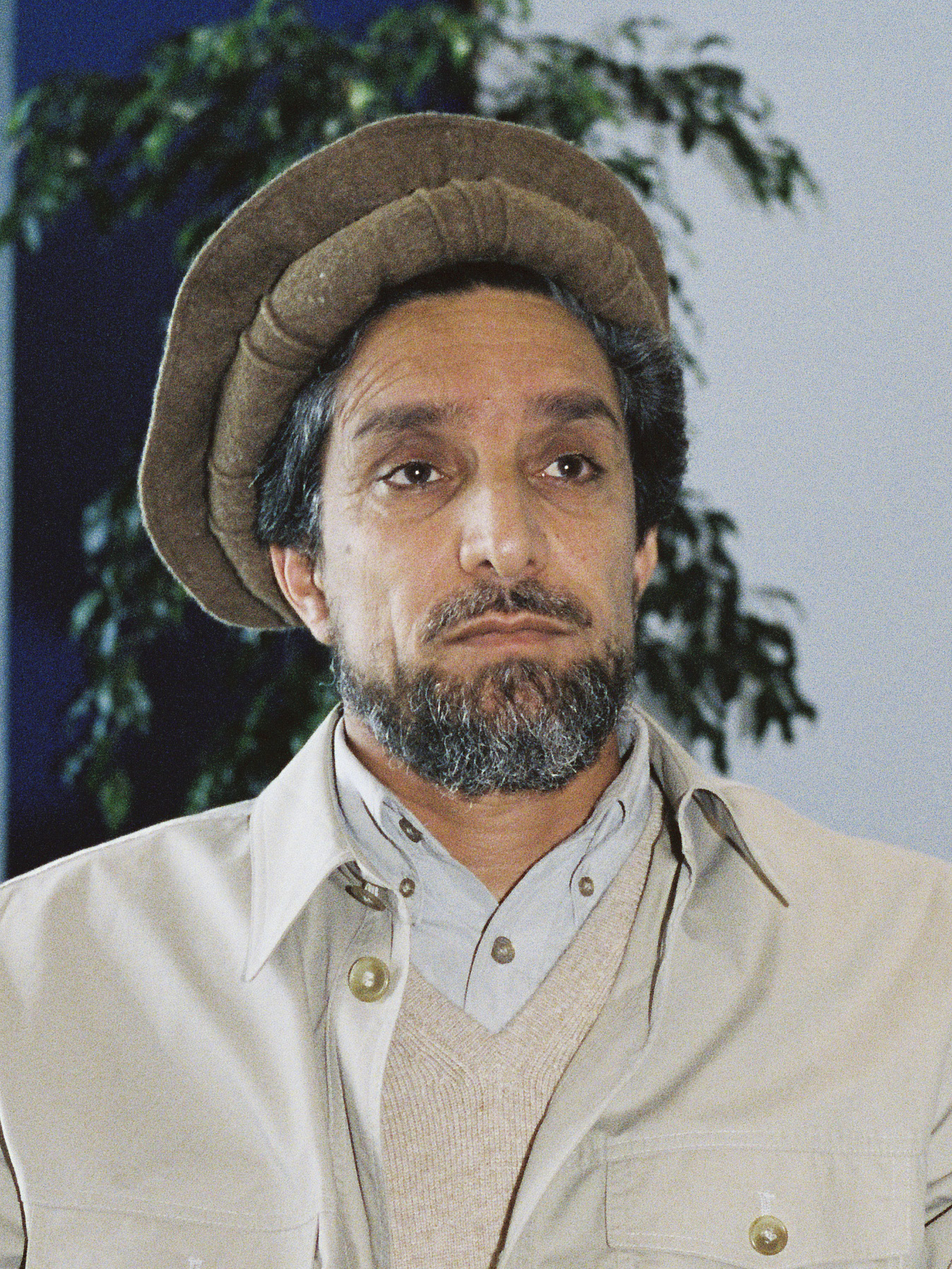
Ahmad Shah Massoud

Beginning in early 1985, the CIA and ISI shipped thousands of translated Qurans across Afghanistan's northern border into the Central Asian Soviet republics. In retaliation for KGB-sponsored bombings that had killed hundreds in Pakistan, the ISI also organized mujahideen teams to carry out violent raids inside Soviet territory, which the CIA was at least aware of. Many other raids were launched by northern Afghan commanders operating largely independently of the ISI and CIA, including by Ahmad Shah Massoud. CIA and State Department analysts were horrified by these raids (believing they could cause an international crisis akin to the 1960 U-2 incident) and Hart's successor William Piekney conveyed a State Department message to Akhtar to the effect that the ISI should not encourage Afghans to cross the Soviet border (albeit with the caveat that, in Piekney's own words, "the Afghans would exploit opportunities that arose and do pretty much what they wanted to do"). However, Yousaf recounted that Casey had approved such acts of sabotage; according to Yousaf, Casey first broached the idea in late 1984 to an ambivalent reception by Akhtar, stating that "You should take the books ... and you can think of sending arms and ammunition if possible." Some of Casey's colleagues questioned this anecdote, but it was later corroborated by Gates (Casey's executive assistant at the time). Because President Reagan never signed a presidential finding to authorize this risky expansion of the CIA's mandate in Afghanistan, which would have entailed notifying certain members of the U.S. Congress, Coll observes: "If Casey spoke the words Yousaf attributed to him, he was almost certainly breaking American law. No one but President Reagan possessed the authority to foment attacks inside the Soviet Union."

As a side note, the CIA began funding Massoud to a limited extent in late 1984 without Pakistani connivance, but CIA officers remained prohibited from interacting with him directly. British and French intelligence officers, however, did not operate under the same legal restrictions as their CIA counterparts and spoke with Massoud in person. The British role was particularly resented by the Pakistanis and some CIA officers found the French to be "grating," but the CIA came to rely on MI6 for intelligence regarding Massoud during these years.

In April 1987, three separate teams of Afghan rebels were directed by the ISI to launch coordinated violent raids on multiple targets across the Soviet border and extending, in the case of an attack on an Uzbek factory, as deep as over 10 miles into Soviet territory. In response, the Soviets issued a thinly veiled threat to invade Pakistan to stop the cross-border attacks: No further attacks were reported. Casey had been forced to resign his DCI post after being afflicted by a brain tumor in December 1986, a condition that proved fatal several months later, but Coll characterized the April 1987 raids as "Casey's last hurrah."

== 1986: Stinger missiles ==
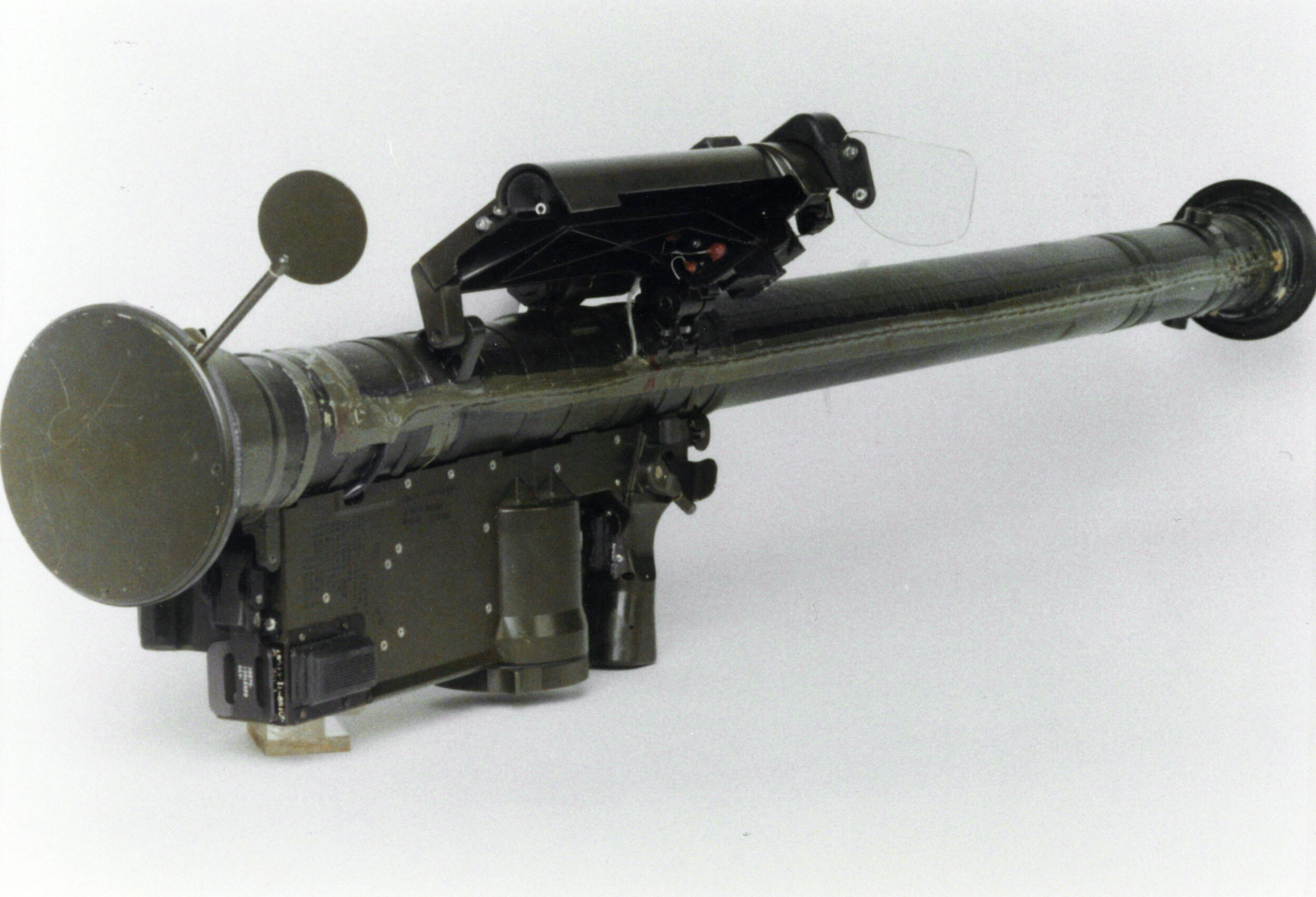
FIM-92 Stinger missile

In late September 1986, roughly two months after Bearden replaced Piekney as Islamabad station chief, the CIA began delivering U.S.-made state of the art FIM-92 Stinger surface-to-air missiles to the mujahideen. The Stingers used infrared homing technology to destroy Soviet aircraft from a distance of roughly 12,500 feet, seriously disrupting the increasingly effective use of low-flying attack helicopters by the Soviet Spetsnaz special forces; the Soviets eventually decided that it was no longer safe to evacuate their wounded by helicopter. CIA officers were aware that the Stingers could easily be used by terrorists to shoot down civilian aircraft and were reticent to abandon the last vestiges of plausible deniability by introducing U.S.-origin weaponry into Afghanistan, but their objections were overruled by Reagan administration hardliners, including by senior State Department official Morton I. Abramowitz. China and Pakistan, which were consulted in advance out of consideration for the security risks posed to those countries by the prospect of Soviet retaliation, approved the deliveries after careful deliberation. The possibility that the Stingers might be diverted for purposes not intended by U.S. policymakers provided an additional impetus for the CIA to expand the number of unilateral agents on its Afghan payroll (including both Massoud and Abdul Haq until Bearden ended direct subsidies to Haq after the latter criticized the ISI's role in the conflict), which was a comparatively minor expense when juxtaposed with the unprecedented congressionally allocated $1.1 billion budget that it had to work with for its Afghan operations in fiscal 1986 ($470 million) and fiscal 1987 ($630 million). Bearden subsequently endorsed supplying the Stingers as a turning point in the Soviet–Afghan war. In total, the CIA sent approximately 2,300 Stingers to Afghanistan, creating a substantial black market for the weapons throughout the Middle East, Central Asia, and even parts of Africa that persisted well into the 1990s. Perhaps 100 Stingers were acquired by Iran. The CIA later operated a program to recover the Stingers through cash buy-backs. Despite Massoud's reputation as one of the most effective mujahideen commanders, Pakistan's ISI made sure that Massoud received just 8 Stingers—a fraction of 1% of the total—and none before 1991.

== 1988: Soviet withdrawal begins ==
There is a growing frustration, bordering on hostility, among Afghans across the ideological spectrum and from a broad range of backgrounds, toward the government of Pakistan and toward the U.S.... The extent of this sentiment appears unprecedented and intensifying.... Most of these observers claim that this effort [by Gulbuddin Hekmatyar and the ISI has the support of the radical Pakistani political party Jamaat-e-Islami Pakistan and of radical Arabs.... While these charges may be exaggerated, the perception they give rise to is deep and broad—and ominous.

— Edmund McWilliams, special envoy to the Afghan resistance, October 1988, as quoted by Steve Coll.

Mikhail Gorbachev emerged as the reformist leader of the Soviet Union in 1985 and was determined to extricate his country from Afghanistan as quickly as possible, openly calling the war a "bleeding wound" in widely reported 1986 remarks. By November 1986 the decision to withdraw Soviet troops had been made, although the exact timetable remained subject to revision; Najibullah was informed of the fait accompli in December. Around the same time, the CIA inaccurately predicted that the Soviet Union would stay the course in Afghanistan, possibly distorting the intelligence to support the hawkish views of Reagan administration officials; even a year later Gates was adamant that the imminent withdrawal was a Soviet ruse, although other officials, such as Secretary of State George Shultz (after speaking with Soviet Foreign Minister Eduard Shevardnadze), by then accepted that the Soviets were sincere. The U.S. rejected out of hand Soviet entreaties to work together to prevent civil war or the rise of what KGB head Vladimir Kryuchkov told Gates would be a "fundamentalist Islamic state" in Afghanistan; U.S. negotiators initially signaled a willingness to suspend CIA support to the mujahideen in exchange for a Soviet withdrawal, but President Reagan personally intervened to declare an aid cut-off unacceptable as long as the Soviets assisted Najibullah's regime. Nevertheless, Soviet withdrawal from Afghanistan began in May 1988 pursuant to the terms of the Geneva Accords and was completed in February 1989. These events produced much elation in the U.S. government—which was only slightly dampened by the deaths of President Zia, Akhtar, and U.S. ambassador to Pakistan Arnold Lewis Raphel in an August 1988 plane crash and by a warning from special envoy to the Afghan resistance Edmund McWilliams that the ISI was colluding with Hekmatyar to install an Islamist regime in Afghanistan by killing or intimidating Hekmatyar's opponents, thereby making a mockery of U.S. claims to support Afghan "self-determination." Raphel's successor Robert B. Oakley and Bearden responded to McWilliams's dissent by working to undermine McWilliams's credibility through an internal investigation that uncovered no personally derogatory information. Meanwhile, President Zia left a formidable legacy including a roughly ten-fold increase in the number of madrassas in Pakistan (a large proportion of them built along the Afghan–Pakistan border) and the transformation of the ISI into a powerful state-within-a-state, much of which the formerly cash-strapped country of Pakistan could not have accomplished without funding from the CIA, Saudi Arabia, and other Arab states in the Persian Gulf. Many of these madrassas introduced a new generation of Afghan religious students, or "taliban," from Kandahar to a severe, Deobandi-influenced interpretation of Islam that had not previously played a significant role in Afghan history or culture.

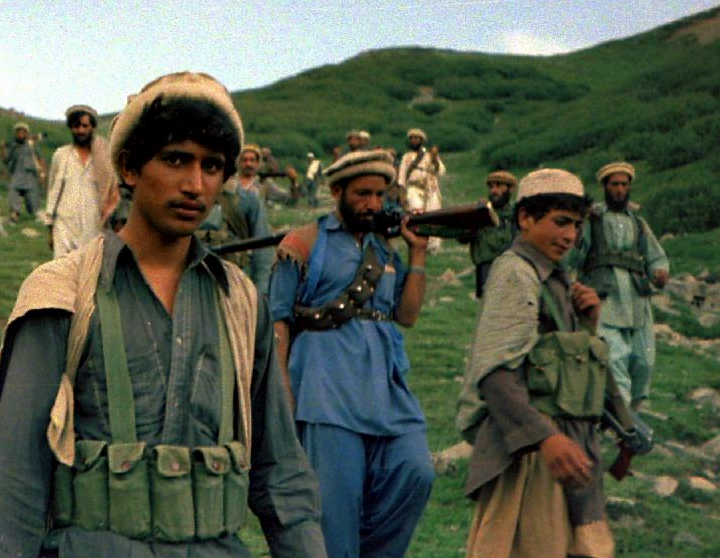
CIA-funded and ISI-trained mujahideen fighters crossing the Durand Line to fight the Soviet-backed Afghan government in 1985

Even after the February 1989 withdrawal, Coll writes that "Thousands of Soviet advisers remained behind."

== 1989 ==
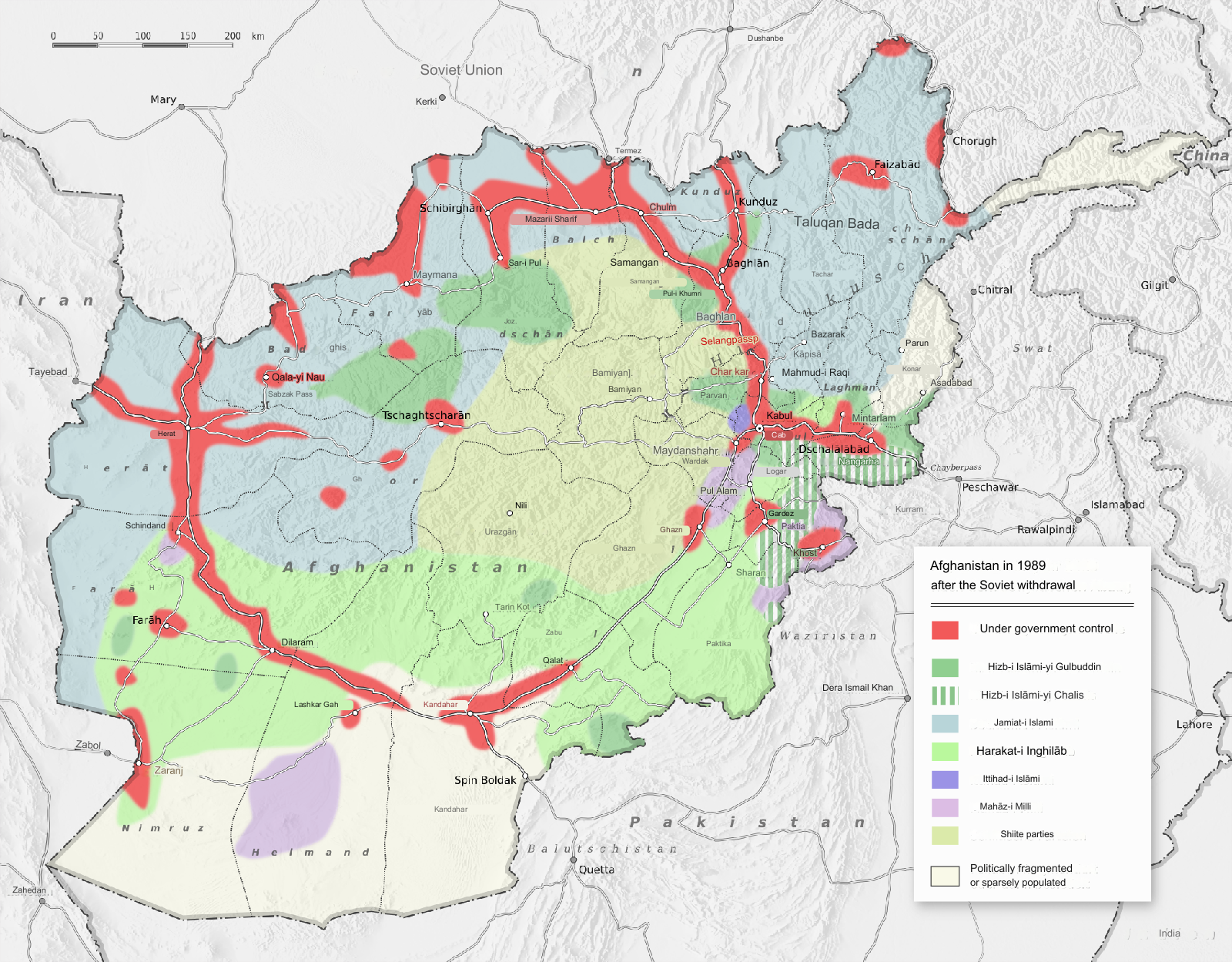
Controlled territory in Afghanistan in 1989

Bearden and the head of the CIA's Afghanistan taskforce, Frank Anderson, were nearly killed by a Saudi jihadist volunteer during a chance encounter while crossing between the Afghan-Pakistan border in 1989.

=== Intelligence analysis ===
A Special National Intelligence Estimate (NIE), "Afghanistan: The War in Perspective", estimated that the Najibullah government "is weak, unpopular, and factionalized, but it will probably remain in power over the next twelve months."

A 1989 CIA estimate put the number of Arab fighters then active in Afghanistan at 4,000 with the majority organized around Abdul Rasul Sayyaf.

== 1991: Hekmatyar breaks with U.S.; Gulf War tanks ==
After Hekmatyar and Sayyaf publicly denounced the U.S. and the Saudi royal family for their role in the 1991 Gulf War against Iraq, U.S. and Saudi officials indicated that they would stop funding both commanders, yet funding continued. However, when the CIA shipped captured Iraqi tanks from Kuwait to Karachi for onward distribution to the mujahideen, the Americans conveyed to the ISI through Saudi intelligence that the tanks should be given to Haqqani as opposed to Hekmatyar.

== 1992: Aid cut-off; civil war begins ==
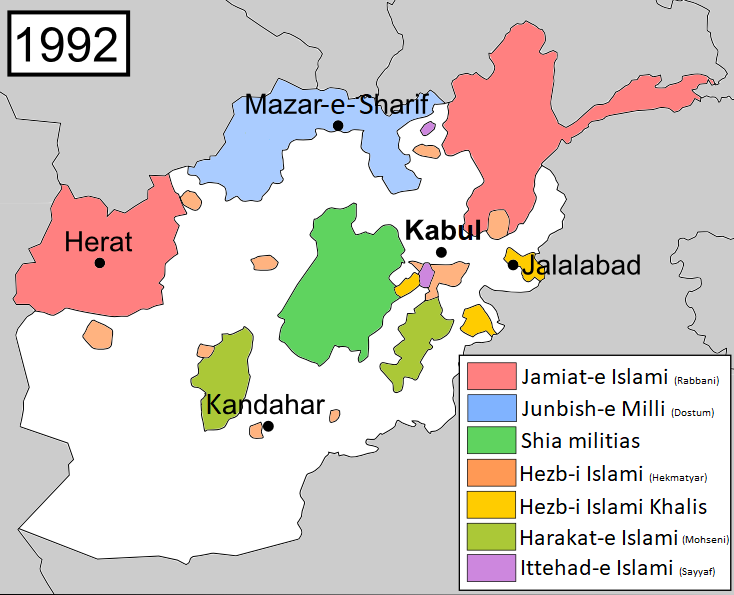
Controlled territory in Afghanistan in 1992

Najibullah's government, backed by hundreds of millions in Soviet aid every month, demonstrated more staying power than some CIA analysts had anticipated, successfully fending off a disastrous 1989 attempt by the mujahideen to take Jalalabad (which was largely planned by Akhtar's successor as ISI Director Hamid Gul, Bearden, and the CIA's designated Kabul station chief Gary Schroen), a winter of 1989–1990 coordinated assault on Kabul and Khost (the failure of which was blamed on Massoud's inability or unwillingness to close the Salang Pass, resulting in a cut to Massoud's CIA stipend), and a March 1990 coup attempt organized by Khalq defector Shahnawaz Tanai in collaboration with Hekmatyar (and reportedly funded by bin Laden). Despite these setbacks, the mujahideen scored a major victory by capturing Khost in early 1991. With the end of the Soviet occupation, policy disagreements between the State Department—including its Bureau of Intelligence and Research (INR) and McWilliams's ambassadorial-level successor as special envoy to Afghanistan Peter Tomsen—and the CIA regarding the future of the Afghan conflict became more pronounced, as illustrated by the CIA's apparent acquiescence in a mass rocket attack on Kabul planned by ISI Director Asad Durrani and Hekmatyar for October 1990 (which was cancelled only after a last-minute intervention by Oakley and Tomsen) and a remark by Under Secretary of State for Political Affairs Robert M. Kimmitt to the effect that the U.S. saw nothing objectionable in Najubullah participating in Afghan elections as part of a peaceful settlement. Regardless, this internal debate would soon be rendered moot by the November 1989 fall of the Berlin Wall and the end of the Cold War.

Shortly after taking office in 1989, U.S. president George H. W. Bush signed a presidential finding renewing the CIA's legal authority to conduct covert operations in Afghanistan, but the country ranked low on the fledgling administration's priorities; Bearden recalled a conversation about Afghanistan in which President Bush asked: "Is that thing still going on?" Congress was losing interest in Afghanistan as well, slashing the CIA's Afghan budget to $280 million for fiscal 1990 with additional cuts in fiscal 1991. In late 1990, the U.S. suspended most aid to Pakistan as a consequence of Pakistan's continued progress towards developing a nuclear weapon, as legally required by an amendment to the Foreign Assistance Act. Finally, after Soviet hardliners tried to oust Gorbachev in a failed August 1991 coup attempt, triggering a series of crises that culminated in the dissolution of the Soviet Union, President Bush's secretary of state James Baker reached an agreement with his Soviet counterpart Boris Pankin for both sides to cease sending weapons to either the mujahideen or Najibullah. This agreement—honored by the new government of Russia—came into force on 1 January 1992, at which point the Soviet Union no longer existed. While the CIA therefore played no direct role in the fall of Kabul (and Afghanistan's subsequent descent into civil war between rival mujahideen factions) later that year, the cessation of external assistance was clearly much more devastating to Najibullah than to the mujahideen (especially when combined with erstwhile Najibullah ally Abdul Rashid Dostum's nearly-simultaneous defection to the latter).

Following Dostum's defection, Massoud and his allied militia captured Kabul International Airport and amassed outside of Kabul from the north, while Hekmatyar and other mujahideen commanders advanced closer to Kabul from Charasyab to the south. In a televised speech, Najibullah stated that he planned to resign as part of a peaceful transition organized by the United Nations (UN). The two factions within Afghanistan's communist party disagreed on the question of whether to surrender to Hekmatyar or to Massoud. Massoud initially declined to enter the capital until a political settlement regarding the future of Afghanistan could be reached between the mujahideen groups then negotiating in Peshawar. After a tense exchange by radio in which Hekmatyar rejected Massoud's pleas for compromise and reconciliation, forces allied with Massoud entered Kabul, preempting Hekmatyar's planned offensive on the city. An interim government was established with Burhanuddin Rabbani—a religious scholar who had taught both Massoud and Hekmatyar during their time at Kabul University—serving as president (after a brief stint by acting president Sibghatullah Mojaddedi) while Massoud took the reins of the defense ministry. Despite being offered the role of prime minister, Hekmatyar (heavily backed by the ISI) bombarded Kabul with rockets, inflicting mass casualties in a flailing bid to impose his personal rule on Afghanistan. The fighting in and around the capital plunged Afghanistan into a multifaceted civil war that would continue for several years, with all sides committing substantial atrocities. Eventually the Taliban, controlled by an obscure, soft-spoken, and insular former participant in Mohammad Yunus Khalis's mujahideen faction named Mohammed Omar emerged from the Pashtun heartland of Kandahar, taking control of all of southern Afghanistan and Herat by September 1995 before driving Massoud and the Afghan interim government from Kabul in September 1996: The Taliban proceeded to ban Afghan women and girls from school and from public life. Extensive Pakistani and Saudi support played a key role in these Taliban victories. Massoud retreated to his native Panjshir Valley, forming the United Front (also known as the "Northern Alliance"), which was backed by India, Iran, and Russia as a bulwark against the further expansion of the Taliban's militant Sunni fundamentalism into Central Asia.

== 1996 ==
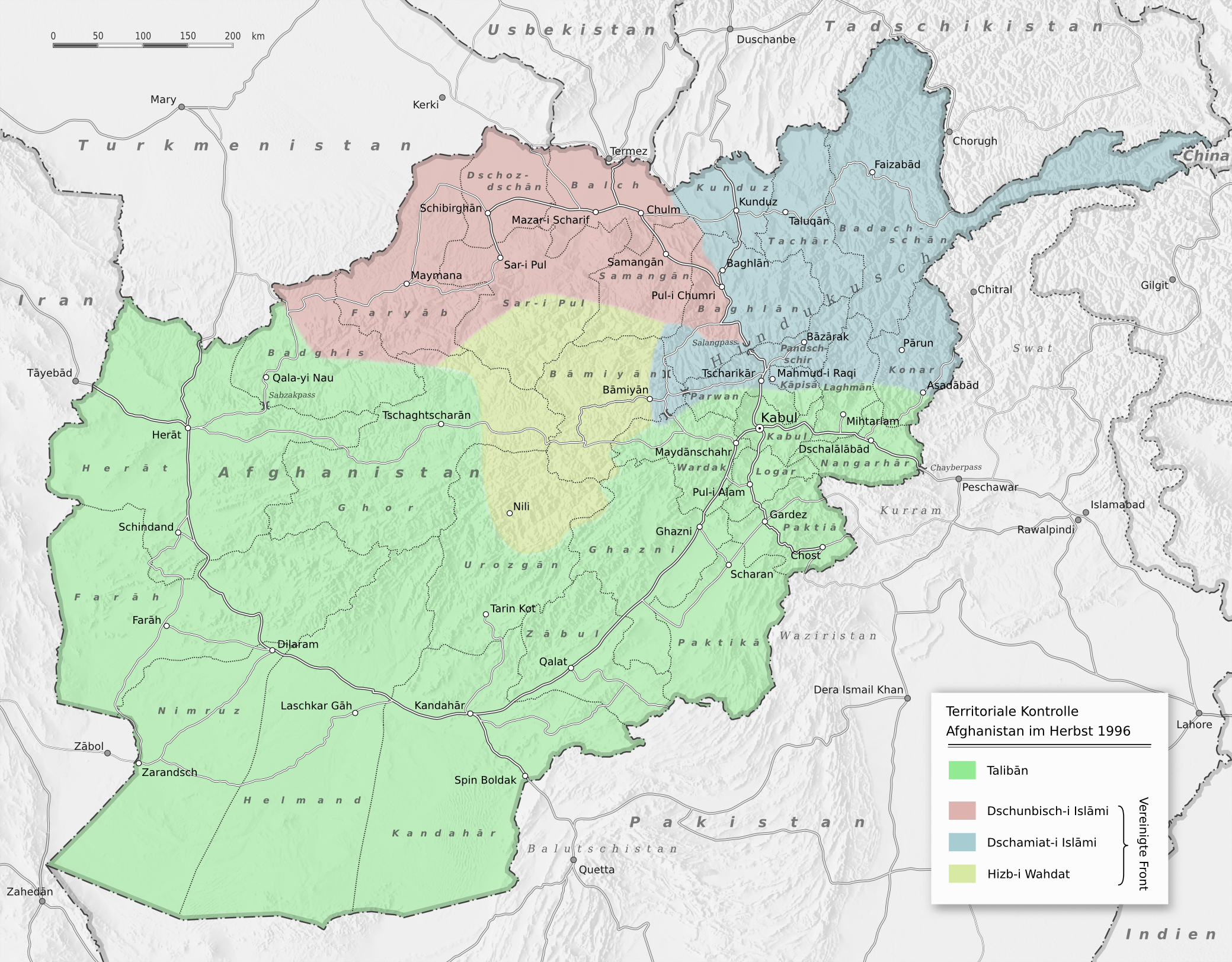
Controlled territory in Afghanistan in 1996

In 1996, the geopolitical landscape surrounding Afghanistan and its militant factions was a complex tapestry of shifting alliances and power plays. Originally, the United States wanted to work with the Taliban as a legitimate political force within Afghanistan. This approach was part of broader efforts to stabilize the region and counter the influence of rival factions.

During this time, the Inter-Services Intelligence (ISI) of Pakistan was actively supporting various militant groups, including the Harakat ul-Ansar (HUA), a Kashmiri outfit. In August 1996, the ISI was providing between $30,000–$60,000 per month to the militant Kashmiri group Harakat ul-Ansar (HUA). This group was also reaching out for money from bin Laden. Bin Laden had returned to Afghanistan earlier in the year after being expelled from Sudan by President Omar al-Bashir under heavy U.S. pressure, initially settling in Jalalabad, which was then controlled by former mujahideen whom bin Laden knew from the 1980s—not by the Taliban. Jalalabad fell to the Taliban in August, shortly before the Taliban evicted Massoud from Kabul, and Bin Laden subsequently moved to Kandahar, where (despite Taliban obfuscations to the effect that bin Laden was merely "a guest of the previous regime") he seems to have established a close relationship with Mullah Omar, who repeatedly praised bin Laden as a hero to Muslims (including in a private September 1998 meeting with Saudi intelligence chief Turki bin Faisal Al Saud, which damaged Afghanistan–Saudi Arabia relations). Despite Taliban attempts to downplay bin Laden's significance as merely a guest, the reality was that bin Laden's influence grew within Taliban circles. The Taliban granted bin Laden and his followers access to the Tarnak Farm complex and to old, U.S.-built apartments located near Kandahar International Airport. As the Taliban solidified its control and its association with figures like bin Laden, concerns escalated within the United States about Pakistan's support for the Taliban. Pakistan supported the Taliban in different ways and Pakistani officials considered themselves to be in control of the group, but history has shown that the Taliban pursued its own interests rather than acting as a proxy for external forces. Pakistani support of the Taliban led to tensions with the U.S., as the Taliban became a more extreme and direct threat to the United States, its citizens, and its foreign dignitaries.

== 1997 ==
In 1997, following the Soviet withdrawal in 1989, the CIA's activities in Afghanistan were largely focused on the aftermath of the Soviet-Afghan War and the rise of the Taliban regime and al-Qaeda's activities within the country. However, with the Cold War over, US priorities shifted. Though the Taliban's control was solidifying in 1997, the US wasn't yet heavily involved. The initial attempt to engage with the Taliban in 1996 continued, but growing concerns about their extremism tempered that approach. The CIA had been involved in supporting various mujahideen factions during the Soviet occupation in the 1980s, providing weapons, training, and financial aid. However, by 1997, the political landscape in Afghanistan had shifted significantly.

During this time, the CIA continued to monitor developments in Afghanistan closely, especially as the Taliban gained control over large parts of the country. The agency was likely involved in gathering intelligence on the Taliban leadership, their activities, and their connections to other extremist groups such as al-Qaeda, Pakistani Islamist Groups, Islamic Movement of Uzbekistan (IMU), Harkat-ul-Mujahideen (HUM), and the Tehrik-i-Taliban Pakistan (TTP). The CIA attempted covert operations aimed at undermining the Taliban regime or supporting opposition groups.

While specific details of the CIA's activities in Afghanistan in 1997 may not be publicly known due to the secretive nature of intelligence operations, it's reasonable to assume that the agency was actively engaged in monitoring and influencing events in the country during this period.

The Clinton administration drew up multiple Presidential Decision Directives (PDD) within its Counter-terrorism Support Group (CSG) that placed the CIA in charge of various programs, including PDD-62:

- Disruption of Terrorist Groups
  - This program called for destruction of terrorist groups by means other than those used by law enforcement.
  - Foreign terrorists who posed credible threats to the US and its citizens were subject to preemption and disruption abroad, consistent with US laws.
- Preventing Terrorists from Acquiring Weapons of Mass Destruction
  - Plans and capabilities would be developed to detect and destroy any effort by a terrorist group to develop or procure chemical, biological, or nuclear weapons.
  - Maintain a "robust capability" to respond to crisis situations involving the threat or use of WMD by terrorist organizations.

== 1998 ==
On 7 August 1998 truck bombs were detonated at the U.S. embassies in two different East African capital cities: Dar es Salaam, Tanzania, and Nairobi, Kenya. These explosions killed 224 people, wounded more than 4,500, and caused a substantial amount of property damage. Although twelve Americans were killed in these attacks, the vast majority of the casualties were Kenyan civilians. A faction of al-Qaeda was determined to be responsible for the attacks. Al-Qaeda's portrayal within the realm of Western media would go on to become relatively notorious in response to the 1998 bombings; bin Laden was subsequently placed on the Federal Bureau of Investigation (FBI)'s most wanted fugitives list. Prior to the bombings, al-Qaeda was relatively unknown to the Western public. The CIA, however, was well aware of al-Qaeda before the attacks. The al-Qaeda cell in East Africa had even been monitored by the CIA prior to the attacks. The Nairobi Embassy had increased security measures and issued warnings about its vulnerabilities. In addition, representatives from the U.S. were sent to the Nairobi Embassy for security assessments, on multiple occasions, prior to the bombings. The embassy bombings exposed potential U.S. vulnerability to the growing global threat posed by terrorism.

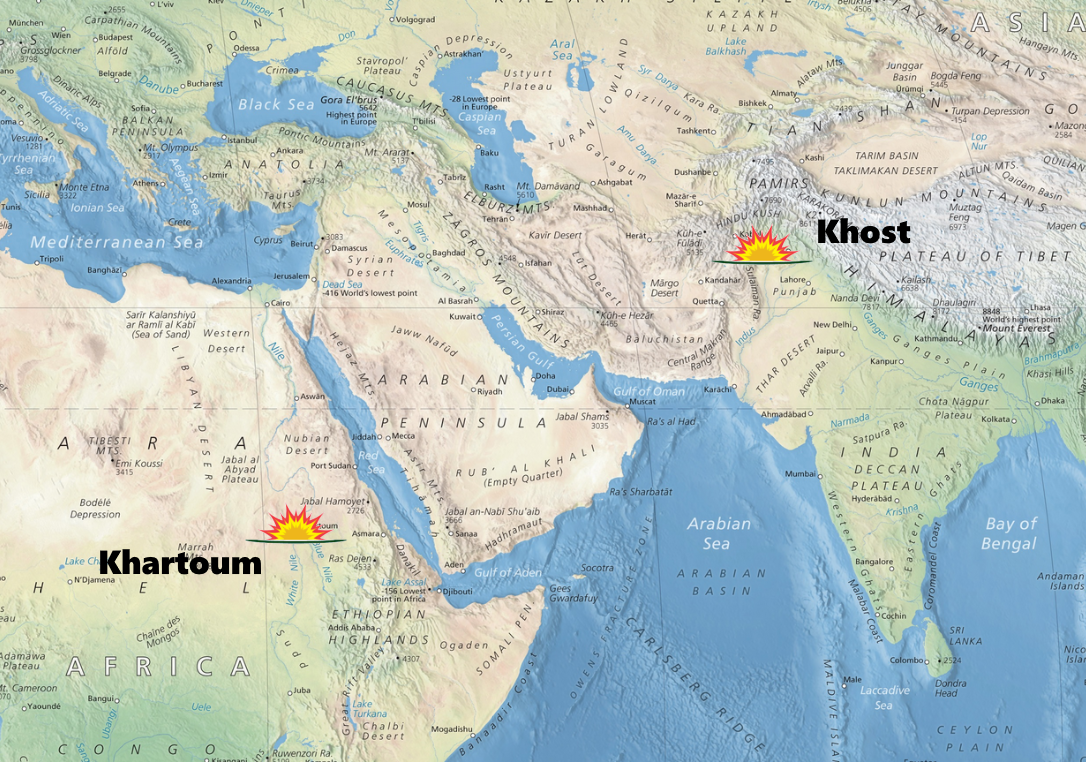
The two al-Qaeda sites bombed in Operation Infinite Reach were at Khartoum, Sudan; and Khost, Afghanistan

In the immediate aftermath of the bombings, U.S. President Bill Clinton ordered cruise missiles strikes at "targets in Sudan and Afghanistan in response to the clear evidence of Bin Laden's responsibility for the planning and execution ... of the bombings." In addition, seven suspected members of al-Qaeda were arrested. On 4 November 1998 the U.S. moved to "indict Osama bin Laden and al-Qaeda military chief Muhammad Atef on 224 counts of murder for the embassy bombings."

== 1999 ==
In a declassified CIA document, there are mentions of bin Laden and the UN's efforts to have him expelled to a country where he could be prosecuted for his crimes: "in our talks we have stressed that UBL (Usama Bin-Laden) has murdered Americans and continues to plan attacks against Americans and others and that we cannot ignore this threat. [The CIA] also emphasized that the international community shares this concern." In this document, the CIA also stressed to the Taliban that bin Laden was not its only terrorist problem, and that it needed to immediately cease all terrorist activities. The Taliban adamantly claimed to be restricting bin Laden's activities. In February, the Memoranda of Notification, a provision signed by the president that oversaw covert action in Afghanistan, "authorized the CIA to work with the Afghan Northern Alliance... against [bin Laden]." In October, the Taliban proposed solutions including a trial of bin Laden by a panel of Islamic scholars or monitoring of bin Laden by the OIC (Organization of Islamic Cooperation) or the UN. The U.S., however refused to be bound by the panel's decisions.

== 2001: September 11 attacks; U.S. invades Afghanistan ==
The CIA began reporting with increasing frequency about the danger that bin Laden posed to the United States. A Senior Executive Intelligence Brief dated 6 February 2001 stated that the threat of Sunni terrorism was growing. The report also stated that the increase in al-Qaeda activities "stems in part from changes to Bin Laden's practices. To avoid implicating himself and his Taliban hosts, Bin Laden over the past two years has allowed cells in his network ... to plan attacks more independently of the central leadership and has tried to gain support for his agenda outside the group." Before the September 11 attacks, United States intelligence had determined that Afghanistan had been a training ground for bin Laden's terrorist network. There were recommendations to bomb all the al-Qaeda camps in Afghanistan by Richard Clarke, but there was no support for the bombing. There was the recommendation of arming the Northern Alliance and targeting bin Laden and his leadership by reinitiating flights of the Predator drone, these ideas were dismissed by Deputy Secretary of Defense Paul Wolfowitz, who called bin Laden a "little terrorist in Afghanistan". Also, neither the CIA nor the Defense Department would agree to running the drone over Afghanistan. These warnings were not enough to stop the attacks from occurring, resulting in the United States invading Afghanistan.

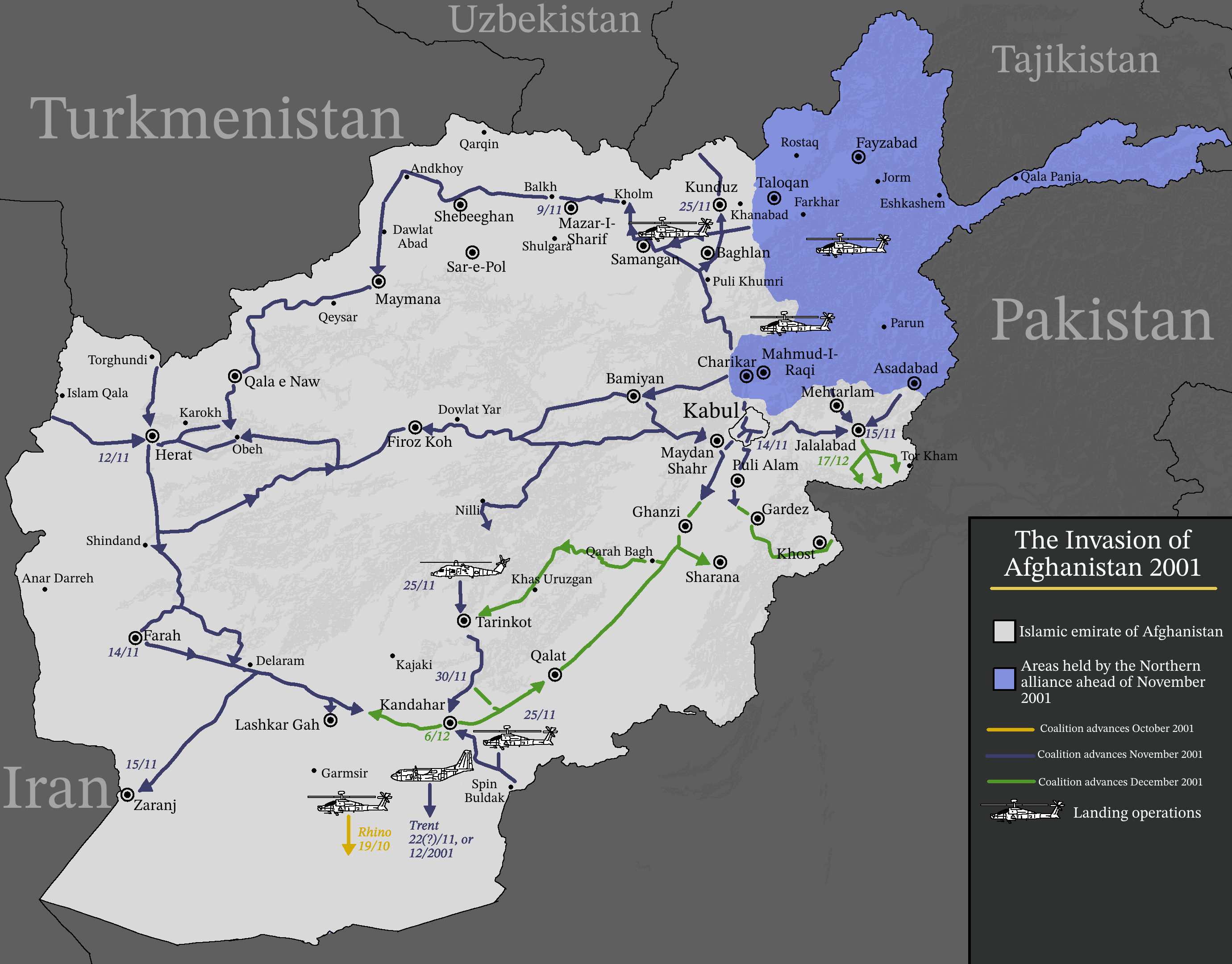
Movements in the 2001 U.S. invasion of Afghanistan

The plan for the 2001 invasion of Afghanistan originated in the CIA's Counterterrorist Center (CTC), then under the leadership of Cofer Black, building off earlier contingency plans for collaboration with the Northern Alliance against the Taliban. It was approved by President George W. Bush following a 15 September presentation by DCI George Tenet, as the Defense Department did not have a pre-existing plan for an invasion of Afghanistan. Mohammed Fahim (who succeeded Massoud following the latter's assassination), Atta Muhammad Nur, Dostum, Khan, and Sayyaf all played important roles in the invasion, which was overseen by the CTC's Henry A. Crumpton. On 26 September, Schroen led the first CIA "Northern Afghanistan Liaison Team" into the Panjshir, long before any Defense Department personnel arrived in Afghanistan. In the end, officers from the CIA's Special Activities Division (SAD), United States Special Operations Command (USSOCOM) special forces, and the Northern Alliance combined to overthrow the Taliban without the need for U.S. military conventional ground forces.

On 30 October 2001 Secretary of Defense Donald Rumsfeld sent an email with the subject line "Strategy" with an attachment of the memo "U.S. Strategy in Afghanistan" to Douglas Feith. In the memo Rumsfeld writes that "CIA and DoD teams on the ground are critical for success-U.S. influence, targeting, logistics, and humanitarian efforts." The goals of these ground teams were to "urge" Afghan ground forces to, among others, "eliminate Al-Qaida, Taliban, and Arab forces to the north and northeast." While the military and coalition forces would closely coordinate to achieve the military goals. The CIA's website says that after President Bush ordered the agency to launch operation against the al-Qa'ida terrorist organization and its Taliban supporters in Afghanistan, that they began to "collect real-time, actionable intelligence to help shape the battlefield and use all means necessary to target al-Qa'ida." A rapid deployment then occurred as a "core group of more than 100 CIA officers ... partnered with local tribal and military forces. Team members took risks and worked with key groups in the area, doing whatever was necessary to accomplish the mission."

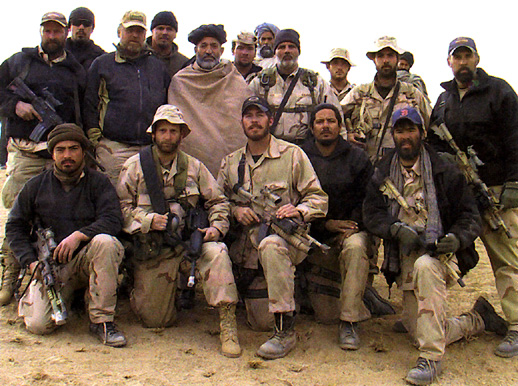
Hamid Karzai with Special Forces and CIA Paramilitary in late 2001

Hamid Karzai was inaugurated as the new President of Afghanistan on 22 December, at which point the war's casualties included just 13 soldiers or CIA officers in the U.S.-led military campaign, along with at least 1,500 to 2,375 Afghan civilians who died primarily from United States Air Force or Navy bombing raids.

The seemingly successful military campaign in Afghanistan, officially dubbed "Operation Enduring Freedom," was met with bipartisan praise in the U.S., with American media hailing it as "a harbinger of a new kind of war," per Coll. However, in the aftermath of the invasion it became clear that U.S. policymakers lacked a long-term plan for addressing Afghanistan's severe poverty and underdevelopment, and that establishing a stable successor regime would be exceptionally challenging. Coll comments that "the shockingly rapid triumph of the C.I.A.-inspired campaign to overthrow the Taliban so exceeded expectations that it blinded some of its architects to their own limitations." Crumpton later conceded: "What we failed to do is to understand that we had to replace the Taliban with something better."

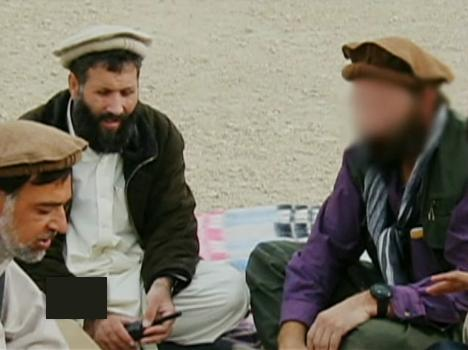
A CIA deputy (right) meeting with Afghan mercenaries at Tora Bora in late 2001

Additionally, bin Laden and hundreds of al-Qaeda fighters escaped into Pakistan as a result of a decision by Secretary of Defense Donald Rumsfeld, United States Central Command commander Tommy Franks, and ultimately President Bush to rely on the CIA-backed Afghan militias of Hazrat Ali and Zahir Qadeer (whose father, Haji Abdul Qadeer, welcomed bin Laden's arrival in Jalalabad in 1996)—along with large-scale B-52 bombardment—instead of sending in U.S. army rangers or marines during the December 2001 Battle of Tora Bora. An alarmed Pakistani President Pervez Musharraf asked Franks "what are you doing? You are flushing these guys [al-Qaeda] out and ... They are pouring in to my country" and requested urgently needed helicopters to move 60,000 Pakistani troops to the Afghan–Pakistan border, but the U.S. refused, citing high demand for helicopters elsewhere. Franks and Rumsfeld were apparently motivated by fear that a substantial American presence near Tora Bora could incite a rebellion by local Pashtuns, despite the latter's lack of organizational capability at the time and the fierce dissent voiced by many CIA analysts including Charles E. Allen (who warned Franks that "the back door [to Pakistan] was open") and Gary Berntsen (who briefly served as the chief of the CIA station informally operating out of the Ariana Hotel in Kabul and who called for army rangers to "kill this baby in the crib"). Regardless, a United States Senate investigation cited the strategic failure at Tora Bora as having a profound impact on both "the course of the conflict in Afghanistan and the future of international terrorism"; Coll argues that it destabilized Pakistan and created a perception among Pakistan's leaders that "their country's rising violence [was] a price of American folly in the fall of 2001." To fill the power vacuum left by the Taliban's collapse, the U.S. relied on corrupt and brutal former mujahideen paid by the CIA; Dostum prominently participated in Afghan politics after his forces murdered hundreds of surrendered Taliban prisoners in shipping containers, while the CIA re-installed Gul Agha Sherzai as governor of Kandahar. Dostum denied personal involvement in the massacre, and the Bush administration did not seem to be concerned with punishing anyone over it. Sherzai was soon using his position to enrich himself with earnings of perhaps $1.5 million per month.

== 2002: Formation of the National Directorate of Security ==
In late 2001 and early 2002, Schroen organized Afghanistan's National Directorate of Security (NDS) in consultation with its first director, Muhammad Arif Sarwari. The NDS inherited workplace culture and personnel from the Soviet-era KHAD, itself commonly described as the Afghan equivalent of the KGB, but Schroen preferred to use SAVAK as a model for the new intelligence agency.

== 2003 ==
=== Intelligence analysis ===
In June 2003, the CIA published a report entitled, "11 September: The Plot and the Plotters." This document analyzes the 9/11 attack and also includes CIA intelligence on al-Qaeda and the attack, including detailed biographical pages on each of the hijackers. According to the report, the CIA found that the attackers had traveled back and forth to Afghanistan and that most of the attackers traveled to Afghanistan to pledge their loyalty to bin Laden.

== 2007 ==
=== Intelligence analysis: Afghan war effort deteriorating ===
In mid-2006, the CIA's Counterterrorism Center hired University of Massachusetts Dartmouth academic Brian Glyn Williams to conduct a study, including field work in Afghanistan and a final research paper (published in 2007), examining the dramatic increase in suicide attacks by Afghan insurgents beginning that year. (Few, if any, suicide attacks were documented during the Soviet–Afghan War and the Taliban is not known to have sanctioned such attacks as part of its war against the Northern Alliance in the 1990s.) Williams documented 149 suicide attacks in 2006, compared to just eight suicide attacks recorded between December 2001 and December 2004, and found evidence that Arab and international jihadists helped export the tactic to Afghanistan as spillover from the Iraq War. However, the vast majority of suicide attackers appeared to be ethnic Pashtuns, not Arabs. In contrast to Iraq, where suicide attacks regularly inflicted mass casualties on soft targets (including mosques) as part of the sectarian Iraqi civil war (2006–2008) between Sunnis and Shi'ites, the majority of suicide attacks in Afghanistan killed only the attacker, and in nearly 9% of cases the bomb failed to detonate or was abandoned; the Afghan suicide attacks were generally directed against military targets, not civilians (as was commonplace in Iraq). The profile that Williams created of Taliban suicide attackers was that of Pashtun males as young as 12 or 13 years old from Waziristan or rural southeastern Afghanistan, recruited (if not coerced) after being educated in fundamentalist madrassas, the families of whom were compensated several thousand dollars in exchange for their sacrifice—a sacrifice that was expected to be honorable, hence the Taliban's preference for hard targets. Coll hypothesizes that because suicide attacks proved relatively unsuccessful against NATO's armored vehicles, in successive years the Taliban switched to relying more on improvised explosive devices (IEDs): "Between 2007 and 2010, the number of Taliban attacks using improvised explosives rose from just over 2,200 to more than 14,000. ... the number of suicide bombings remained steady at just over 100 per year."

In late 2007, analysts from the CIA's Directorate of Intelligence produced the first of many "District Assessment" maps of Afghanistan's 398 administrative districts, which assigned a color-coded rating to each district documenting control by the U.S.–backed Hamid Karzai-led Afghan government, control by the Taliban, contested districts, and districts under the "local control" of rival warlords, based on approximately three dozen metrics of data. The CIA's "District Assessments" were widely shared across U.S. government agencies, becoming "one of the most popular top secret analytic products the agency had ever distributed," according to Coll. The CIA's 2007 map showed that the Taliban controlled or contested roughly half of the official districts in Afghanistan, sharply undercutting optimistic assessments by International Security Assistance Force (ISAF) commander Dan K. McNeill and U.S. ambassador to Afghanistan William Braucher Wood but echoing the growing doubts about progress in the war expressed by U.S. secretary of state Condoleezza Rice and her counselor Eliot A. Cohen.

== 2008 ==
The CIA continued to observe and obtain information on the conditions in Afghanistan to decide their next course of action. On 5 September 2008, an info memo for the Secretary of Defense, from the United States Central Command, provided a report on how "to improve the security situation in Afghanistan over the next 18-24 months." While the majority of the document remained redacted even after being declassified, the document contained a comparison of geographic statistics between Iraq and Afghanistan: "The differences are much more than physical: Iraq is an advanced society ... Afghanistan is not." This info memo likely influenced the Obama administration's decision to increase troops after performing a reassessment of the situation in Afghanistan.

== 2009 ==
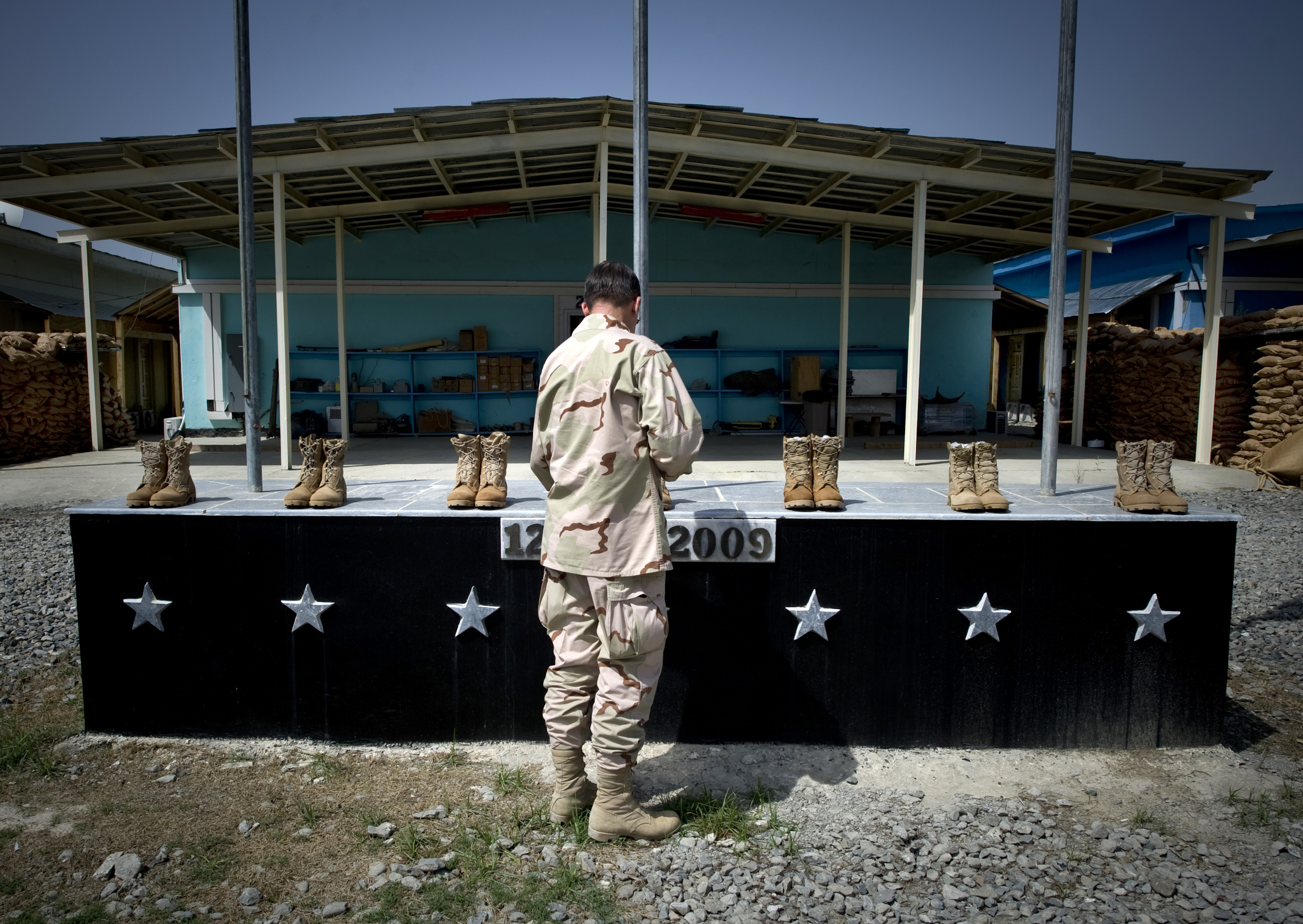
Admiral Michael Mullen at a memorial for the seven American victims of the Camp Chapman attack

=== Forward Operating Base Chapman attack ===
On 30 December 2009, a suicide attack occurred at Forward Operating Base Chapman, a major CIA base in the province of Khost, Afghanistan. Seven CIA officers, including the chief of the base, were killed and six others seriously wounded in the attack. The attack was the second deadliest carried out against the CIA, after the 1983 United States embassy bombing in Beirut, Lebanon, and was a major setback for the intelligence agency's operations.

== 2010s ==
During the 2010s, the CIA was engaged in a program to kill or capture militant leaders, codenamed ANSOF, previously Omega. CIA manpower was supplemented with personnel assigned from United States Army Special Operations Command.

"Green-on-blue" or "insider attacks," in which Afghan soldiers or police officers attacked their American or European counterparts, became a major concern in 2010 and peaked in 2012—when they accounted for nearly 25% of ISAF casualties—before declining during 2013–2014 as international forces withdrew from the conflict. The scale of the insider attacks shocked CIA analysts, who could find no similar phenomenon during the Vietnam War, the Soviet–Afghan War, or any other counter-insurgency in modern history.

In mid–2019, the NGO Human Rights Watch stated that "CIA-backed Afghan strike forces" had committed "serious abuses, some amounting to war crimes" since late 2017.

== 2021: Evacuation ==
Director of the Central Intelligence Agency William J. Burns met with high-ranking Taliban official Abdul Ghani Baradar in Kabul shortly after the city's August 2021 capture by the Taliban to discuss the 31 August deadline for the U.S. to complete its evacuation of the country.

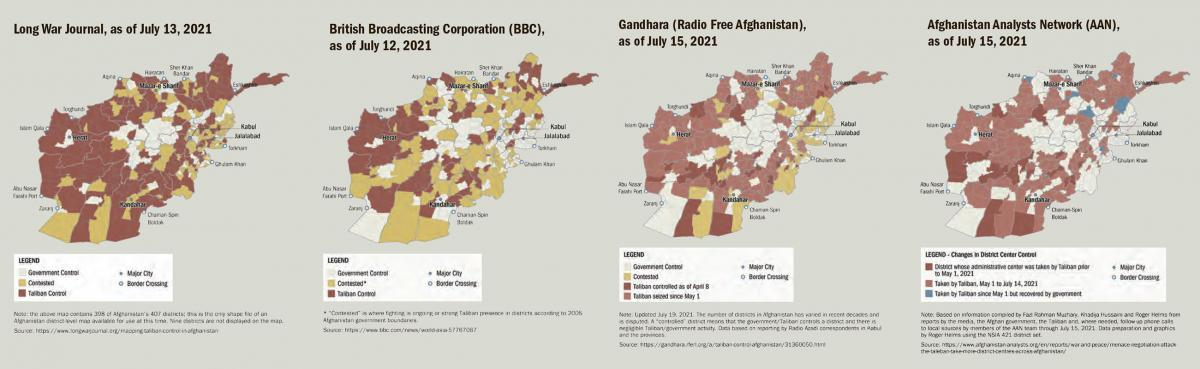
Estimates of Taliban controlled districts in Afghanistan as of mid-July 2021 ranged as high as more than half. The number had increased from 73 in April to 221 in July, a harbinger of the August takeover in Kabul.

== 2022 ==
=== Killing of Ayman al-Zawahiri ===
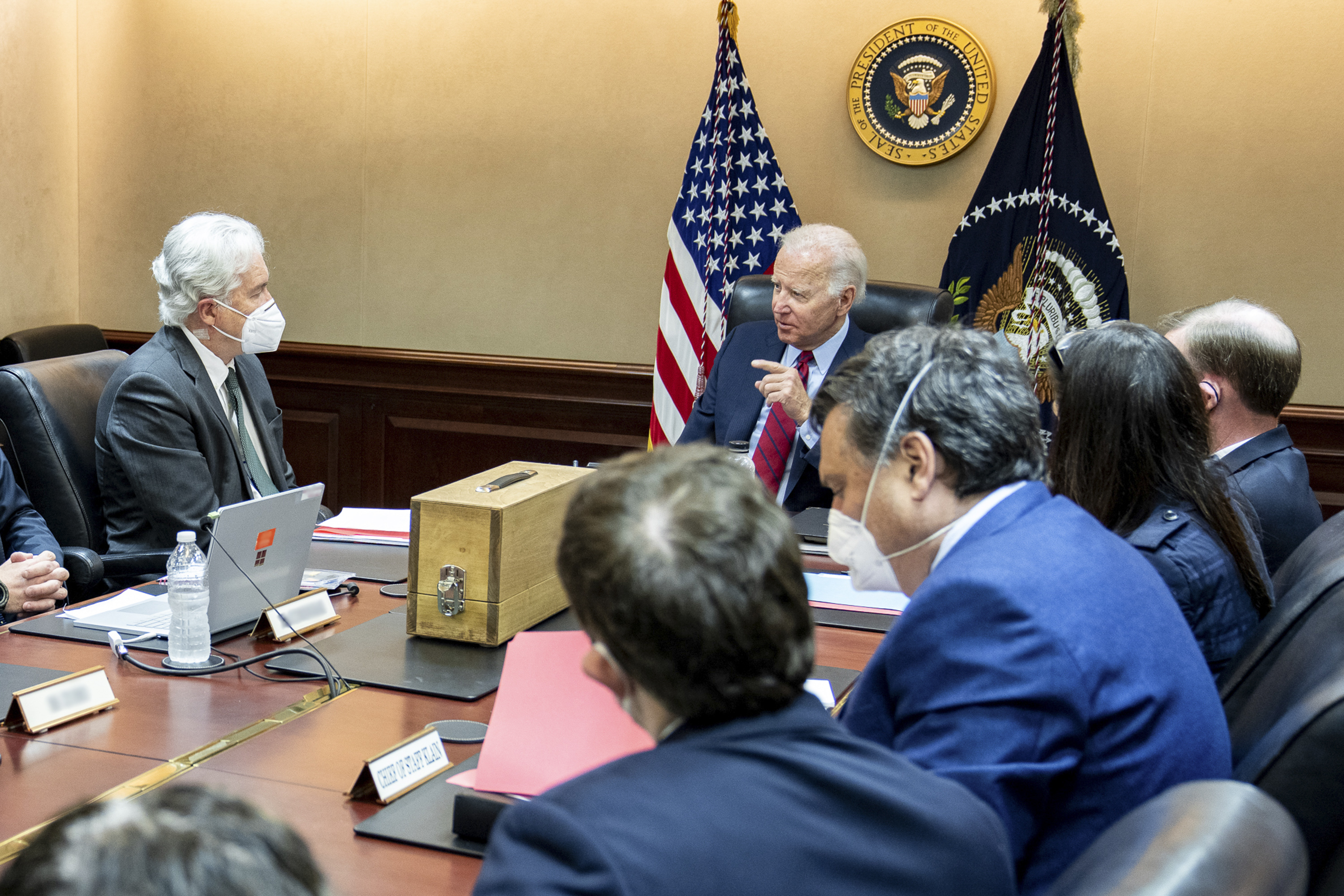
U.S. president Joe Biden meets with his national security team on 1 July 2022 to discuss the drone strike on Ayman al-Zawahiri which happened on 31 July

On 31 July 2022, nearly a year after the war in Afghanistan had concluded, a CIA drone strike killed al-Qaeda leader Ayman al-Zawahiri while in his safehouse in Kabul. The drone had fired two RX9 Hellfire missiles at Zawahiri while he was entering the balcony of the safehouse. The United States justified the drone strike on the grounds that Zawahiri's presence in Afghanistan violated the Doha Agreement, in which the Taliban pledged to not allow any global terrorist groups safehaven in the country as they had done before. Though the Haqqani Network reportedly facilitated his refuge in the country, the Taliban denied Zawahiri's presence in Afghanistan and condemned the attack.

== See also ==
- Death of Abdul Wali
- Inter-Services Intelligence activities in Afghanistan
