= Inter-Services Intelligence activities in Afghanistan =

Pakistani covert action in Afghanistan

- Part of Soviet–Afghan War, Operation Cyclone, War in Afghanistan (1989–2001) and War in Afghanistan (2001–2021)
- Operational scope: Strategic and tactical
- Location: Afghanistan
- Date: 1975–present

Inter-Services Intelligence (ISI), Pakistan's principal intelligence and covert action agency, has historically conducted a number of clandestine operations in its western neighbor, Afghanistan. ISI's covert support to militant jihadist insurgent groups in Afghanistan, the Pashtun-dominated former Federally Administered Tribal Areas, and Kashmir has earned it a reputation as the primary progenitor of many South Asian jihadist groups.

The first publicly-known ISI operation in Afghanistan occurred in 1975, in response to a limited border conflict between the two nations. ISI's operations in Afghanistan grew exponentially in response to the 1979 Soviet invasion of Afghanistan, with backing from Saudi Arabia and the United States' Operation Cyclone. Islamist militant mujahideen groups fighting the communist Afghan government and its later defenders, the Soviet Union, were funded, trained, and equipped by ISI and successfully forced the withdrawal of Soviet forces from Afghanistan and the overthrow of the Soviet-backed communist government of Afghanistan. The previously allied, ISI-supported mujahideen groups began to compete for power, initiating three successive civil wars (1989–1992, 1992–1996, and 1996–2001). When Gulbuddin Hekmatyar's Hezb-e Islami, ISI's preferred mujahideen group, showed little promise of seizing Kabul and lost popular support through a bloody shelling of the city, ISI sought a new group to establish an Afghan government friendly to Pakistan's interests.

After the Taliban demonstrated it could clear routes for Pakistani land trade in the 1994 capture of Spin Boldak through Kandahar City, the ISI dropped support for Hekmatyar's Hezb-e Islami and shifted its focus to the Taliban. Through ISI, Pakistan armed, equipped, and supplied young fighters to the movement from jihadist Deobandi religious schools (madrassas) in the relatively ungoverned Pashtun tribal areas of Pakistan's Northwest Frontier Province. ISI continued to support the Taliban through its 1996 capture of Kabul and declaration of the Taliban's Islamic Emirate of Afghanistan. From 1996 to late 2001, Pakistan backed the Taliban in its war against the remaining allied mujahideen groups in the country's north, united under the banner of the Northern Alliance (United Front), led by Burhanuddin Rabbani and Ahmad Shah Massoud.

After the September 11th attacks against the United States by Osama bin Laden's Taliban-hosted and Afghanistan-based al-Qaeda, Pakistan publicly declared its support to the United States in their war against al-Qaeda in Afghanistan and their Taliban hosts. Despite the public pledge of support, Pakistan was believed by international observers and the subsequent Afghan government to maintain its backing of the Taliban and, in the view of some, al-Qaeda.

Pakistan's motivation for covert activities in Afghanistan, since the cessation of hostilities between the two nations in the mid-1970s, has largely focused on supporting (Hezb-i Islami, Taliban) or opposing (PDPA, Soviet, Northern Alliance) various groups in an attempt to influence the Afghan government. This campaign to seat and preserve an Afghan government friendly to Pakistani interests (and opposed to Indian interests) has largely centered on support to groups ideologically aligned with Islamabad, typically Pashtun, socially conservative, political Islamist, and Deobandi (Sunni).

== Early interference ==
In his history of the ISI, author Hein Kiessling claims that the Republic of Afghanistan support to anti-Pakistani militants had forced then-Prime Minister of Pakistan Zulfiqar Ali Bhutto and Naseerullah Khan Babar, then-Inspector General of the Frontier Corps in NWFP (now Khyber Pakhtunkhwa), to adopt a more aggressive approach towards Afghanistan. As a result, ISI, under the command of Major General Ghulam Jilani Khan set up a 5,000-strong Afghan guerrilla troop, which would include future influential leaders like Gulbuddin Hekmatyar, Burhanuddin Rabbani and Ahmed Shah Masood, to target the Afghan government. Their first large operation was the sponsoring of a 1975 armed rebellion in the Panjshir valley. In a polemical assessment, Afghan feminist Alia Rawi Akbar writes that Massoud, during this uprising, "by the order of ISI", assassinated the mayor "of his home city", before he "ran to Pakistan."

Owen Sirrs, another historian of the ISI, explains how the 1973 coup d'état brought proponent of a Pashtunistan independent state and fiercely anti-Pakistan Sardar Mohammed Daoud Khan to presidency, helping both Pashtun and Baloch militants. This convinced Bhutto to use Islamist rebels in order to fight the ethnic Pashtun or Baloch brands of nationalism. He described the ISI plan in multiple phases, saying that phase one was increasing surveillance, phase two was contacting the exiled "Afghan King" to attempt connecting him with the anti-Daoud movement, and phase three was joint operations against Afghanistan with Iran. Phase three also involved recruiting from anti-Daoud Afghan exiles in Pakistan, a group which would include the likes of Ahmed Shah Massoud, Burhanuddin Rabbani, Sibghatullah Mojadeddi, Gulbuddin Hekmatyar, Jalaluddin Haqqani and Abdul Rasul Sayyaf, all future political heavyweights of the country.

In 1974, the then-Prime Minister of Pakistan Zulfiqar Ali Bhutto said, "Two can play this game. We know where their weak points are just as they know ours. The Non-Pashtun there hate the Pashtun domination. So we have our ways of persuading Daoud not to aggravate our problems."

Abdullah Anas, a leader and key ideologue of Afghan Arabs, says in his memoirs that ISI supported the Tajik insurgents "with the blessing of Pakistan's President Zulfikar Ali Bhutto, who hoped to use this uprising as a means to pressure the Afghan government to resolve the border disputes over Balochistan and Pashtunistan." He described their first military insurrection in 1975 as "a fiasco." Hekmatyar, who remained in Peshawar, sent men to attack government outposts in Surkhrud without much success. Meanwhile, a second group led by Massoud in his native Panjshir valley took control of government buildings for a few days before eventually losing them, along with many of his men, to Daud Khan's forces. This incident irritated Massoud and made him wary of Hekmatyar, blaming him for the failed operation.

The Pakistani-backed rebellion, though unsuccessful, shook Daoud Khan. He started softening his stance against Pakistan and considered improving relations with Pakistan. He realized that a friendly Pakistan was in his interest. He also accepted the Shah of Iran's offer to normalize relations between Pakistan and Afghanistan. In August 1976, Daoud Khan also recognized the Durand Line as the international border between Pakistan and Afghanistan.

== Hezb-e Islami Gulbuddin ==
=== Summary ===
Flag used by Hezb-e Islami Gulbuddin

In 1979, the Soviet Union intervened in the Afghan Civil War. The ISI and the CIA worked together to recruit Muslims throughout the world to take part in the Jihad against the Soviet forces. However, the CIA had little direct contact with the Mujahideen as the ISI was the main contact and handler, and they favored the most radical of the groups, namely the Hezb-e Islami of Gulbuddin Hekmatyar.

In 1989, after the Soviets had left Afghanistan, the ISI tried to install a government under Hekmatyar with Jalalabad as their provisional capital, but failed. The Afghan Interim Government, which they wanted to install, had Hekmatyar as Prime Minister and Abdul Rasul Sayyaf as Foreign Minister. The central Pakistani organizer of the offensive was Lieutenant-General Hamid Gul, Director-General of the ISI. The Jalalabad operation was seen as a grave mistake by other mujahideen leaders such as Ahmad Shah Massoud and Abdul Haq. Neither Massoud nor Haq had been informed of the offensive beforehand by the ISI, and neither had participated, as both commanders were considered too independent.

After operations by the Shura-e Nazar of Ahmad Shah Massoud, the defection of the communist general Abdul Rashid Dostum, and the subsequent fall of the communist Mohammad Najibullah regime in 1992, the Afghan political parties agreed on a peace and power-sharing agreement, the Peshawar Accords. The Accords created the Islamic State of Afghanistan and appointed an interim government for a transitional period to be followed by general elections. According to Human Rights Watch:

The sovereignty of Afghanistan was vested formally in the Islamic State of Afghanistan, an entity created in April 1992, after the fall of the Soviet-backed Najibullah government.... With the exception of Hekmatyar's Hezb-e Islami, all of the parties... were ostensibly unified under this government in April 1992. ... Hekmatyar's Hezb-e Islami, for its part, refused to recognize the government for most of the period discussed in this report and launched attacks against government forces and Kabul generally.... Shells and rockets fell everywhere.

Gulbuddin Hekmatyar received operational, financial and military support from Pakistan. Afghanistan expert Amin Saikal concludes in Modern Afghanistan: A History of Struggle and Survival:

Pakistan was keen to gear up for a breakthrough in Central Asia.... Islamabad could not possibly expect the new Islamic government leaders... to subordinate their own nationalist objectives in order to help Pakistan realize its regional ambitions.... Had it not been for the ISI's logistic support and supply of a large number of rockets, Hekmatyar's forces would not have been able to target and destroy half of Kabul.

By 1994, however, Hekmatyar had proved unable to conquer territory from the Islamic State. Australian National University Professor William Maley writes, "in this respect he was a bitter disappointment to his patrons."

=== During the Islamic Republic of Afghanistan ===
After the Afghan Presidential Elections in 2009, Afghan President Hamid Karzai became increasingly isolated, surrounding himself with members of Hekmatyar's Hezb-e Islami and refusing the advice of others.

Al-Jazeera wrote in early 2012 that the Presidential Chief of Staff, Karim Khoram from Hekmatyar's Hezb-e Islami, besides controlling the Government Media and Information Center, enjoyed a "tight grip" over President Karzai. Former co-workers of Khoram accused him of acting "divisive internally" and of having isolated Hamid Karzai's "non-Pashtun allies". Al-Jazeera observed: "The damage that Khoram has inflicted on President Karzai's image in one year - his enemies could not have done the same." Senior non-Hezb-e Islami Pashtun officials in the Afghan government accused Khoram of acting as a spy for Pakistan's Inter-Services Intelligence.

== Afghan Taliban ==
=== Summary ===
Flag used by the Afghan Taliban.

The Taliban were largely funded by Pakistan's Interior Ministry under Naseerullah Babar and the Inter-Services Intelligence (ISI) in 1994. In 1999, Naseerullah Babar, who was the minister of the interior under Bhutto during the Taliban's ascent to power, said, "we created the Taliban".

William Maley, Professor at the Australian National University and Director of the Asia-Pacific College, writes on the emergence of the Taliban in Afghanistan:

"In 1994, with the failure of [Gulbuddin Hekmatyar's alliance] attempt to oust [the Afghan] Rabbani [administration], Pakistan found itself in an awkward position. Hekmatyar had proved incapable of seizing and controlling defended territory: in this respect he was a bitter disappointment to his patrons. ... In October 1994, [Pakistani interior minister] Babar [took] a group of Western ambassadors (including the US Ambassador to Pakistan John C. Monjo) to Kandahar, without even bothering to inform the Kabul government, even though it manned an embassy in Islamabad. ... On 29 October 1994, a convoy of trucks, including a notorious ISI officer, Sultan Amir ... and two figures who were later to become prominent Taliban leaders, entered Afghanistan."

The ISI used the Taliban to establish a Pakistan-favorable Afghan regime, as they were trying to gain strategic depth. Since the creation of the Taliban, the ISI and the Pakistani military have given financial, logistical, and military support, including direct combat support.

The ISI trained 80,000 fighters against the Soviet Union in Afghanistan. Peter Tomsen also stated that up until 9/11, Pakistani military and ISI officers, along with thousands of regular Pakistani armed forces personnel, had been involved in the fighting in Afghanistan.

Human Rights Watch wrote in 2000:

"Of all the foreign powers involved in efforts to sustain and manipulate the ongoing fighting [in Afghanistan], Pakistan is distinguished both by the sweep of its objectives and the scale of its efforts, which include soliciting funding for the Taliban, bankrolling Taliban operations, providing diplomatic support as the Taliban's virtual emissaries abroad, arranging training for Taliban fighters, recruiting skilled and unskilled manpower to serve in Taliban armies, planning and directing offensives, providing and facilitating shipments of ammunition and fuel, and ... directly providing combat support."

In 1998, Iran accused Pakistani commandos of "war crimes at Bamiyan". The same year, Russia said that Pakistan was responsible for the "military expansion" of the Taliban in northern Afghanistan by sending large numbers of Pakistani troops, including ISI personnel, some of whom had subsequently been taken as prisoners by the anti-Taliban United Islamic Front for the Salvation of Afghanistan (Northern Alliance).

In 2000, the UN Security Council imposed an embargo against military support to the Taliban, with UN officials explicitly singling out Pakistan. The UN secretary-general criticized Pakistan for its military support and the Security Council stated it was "deeply distress[ed] over reports of involvement in the fighting, on the Taliban side, of thousands of non-Afghan nationals." In July 2001, several countries, including the United States, accused Pakistan of being "in violation of U.N. sanctions because of its military aid to the Taliban." The Taliban also obtained financial resources from Pakistan. In 1997 alone, after the capture of Kabul by the Taliban, Pakistan gave $30 million in aid and a further $10 million for government wages.

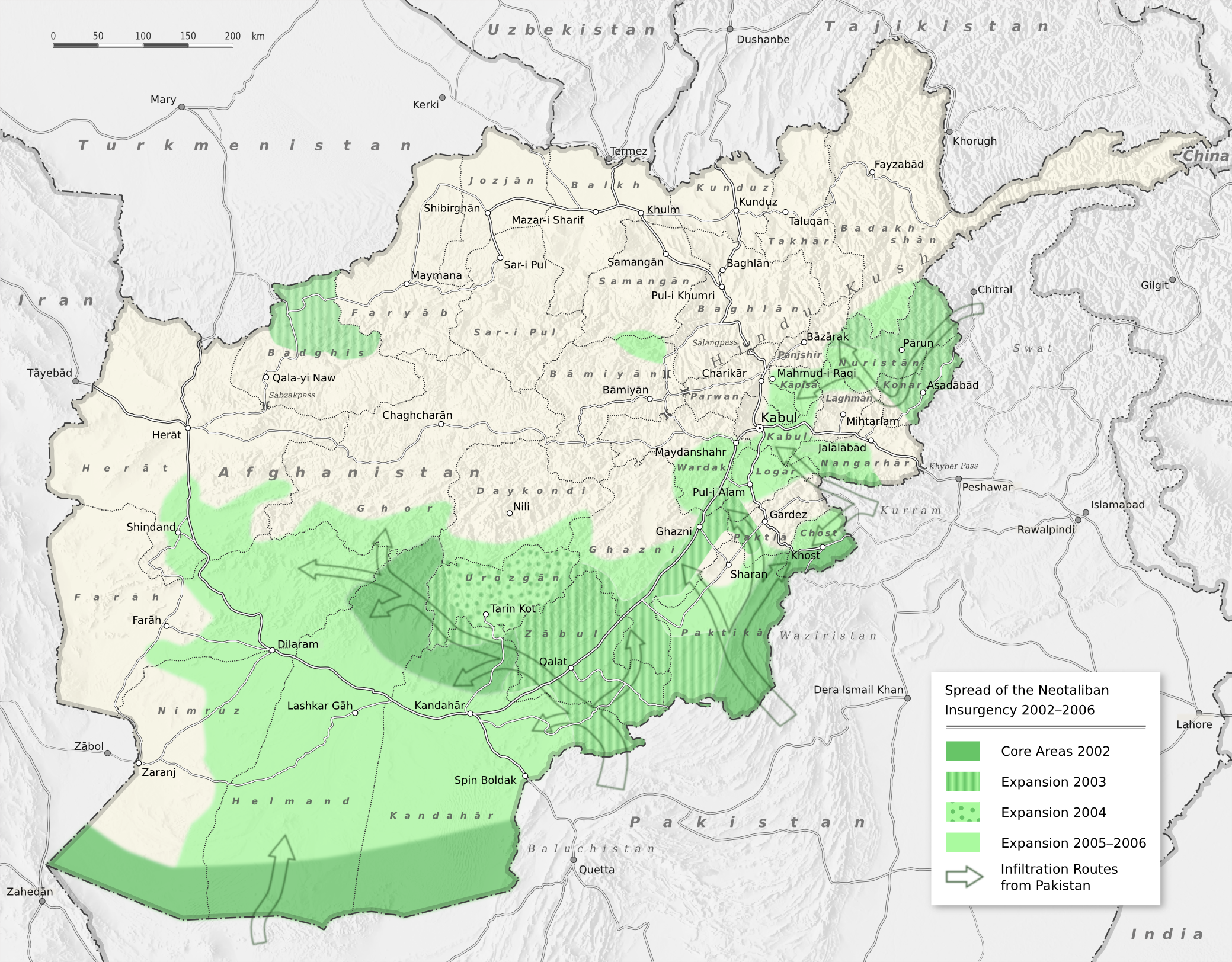
Development of the Taliban insurgency up until 2006 infiltrating from Pakistan into Afghanistan's Pashtun areas.

The Taliban are not Islam - the Taliban are Islamabad.

After the 9/11 attacks, Pakistan claimed to have ended its support for the Taliban. But with the fall of Kabul to anti-Taliban forces in November 2001, ISI forces cooperated somewhat with Taliban militias who were in full retreat. In November 2001, Taliban and Al-Qaeda combatants and Pakistani ISI and other military operatives were evacuated from the Afghan city of Kunduz on Pakistan Army cargo aircraft to Pakistan Air Force bases in Chitral and Gilgit in Pakistan's Northern Areas in what has been dubbed the "Airlift of Evil".

A range of officials inside and outside Pakistan have stepped up suggestions of links between the ISI and terrorist groups in recent years. In fall 2006, a leaked report by a British Defense Ministry think tank charged, "Indirectly Pakistan (through the ISI) has been supporting terrorism and extremism--whether in London on 7/7 [the July 2005 attacks on London's transit system], or in Afghanistan, or Iraq." In June 2008, Afghan officials accused Pakistan's intelligence service of plotting a failed assassination attempt on President Hamid Karzai; shortly thereafter, they implied the ISI's involvement in a July 2008 Taliban attack on the Indian embassy. Indian officials also blamed the ISI for the bombing of the Indian embassy. Numerous U.S. officials have also accused the ISI of supporting terrorist groups, including the Afghan Taliban. U.S. Defense Secretary Robert Gates said, "to a certain extent, they play both sides." Gates and others suggest the ISI maintains links with groups like the Afghan Taliban as a "strategic hedge" to help Islamabad gain influence in Kabul once U.S. troops exit the region. U.S. Chairman of the Joint Chiefs of Staff Admiral Mike Mullen in 2011 called the Haqqani network (the Afghan Taliban's most destructive element) a "veritable arm of Pakistan's ISI". He further stated, "Extremist organizations serving as proxies of the government of Pakistan are attacking Afghan troops and civilians as well as US soldiers."

A 2010 report by a leading British institution also claimed that Pakistan's intelligence service still had a strong link with the Taliban in Afghanistan. Published by the London School of Economics, the report said that Pakistan's ISI has an "official policy" of support for the Taliban. It said the ISI provides funding and training for the Taliban, and the agency has representatives on the Quetta Shura, the Taliban's leadership council. The report, based on interviews with Taliban commanders in Afghanistan, was written by Matt Waldman, a fellow at Harvard University. "Pakistan appears to be playing a double-game of astonishing magnitude," the report said. The report also linked high-level members of the Pakistani government with the Taliban. It said Asif Ali Zardari, the Pakistani president, met with senior Taliban prisoners in 2010 and promised to release them. Zardari reportedly told the detainees they were only arrested because of US pressure. "The Pakistan government's apparent duplicity – and awareness of it among the American public and political establishment – could have enormous geopolitical implications," Waldman said. "Without a change in Pakistani behavior it will be difficult if not impossible for international forces and the Afghan government to make progress against the insurgency." Amrullah Saleh, director of Afghanistan's intelligence service until June 2010, told Reuters in 2010 that the ISI was "part of a landscape of destruction in this country".

In March 2012, the Commander of NATO forces in Afghanistan, General John Allen, told the United States Senate that as of 2012, there was still no change in Pakistan's policy of support for the Afghan Taliban and its Haqqani network. When asked by U.S. Senator John McCain whether the ISI had severed its links with the Afghan Taliban, General Allen testified: "No."

=== Recruitment ===
The Pakistani army, through the ISI, has been accused of recruiting fighters and suicide bombers for the Afghan Taliban from among the 1.7 million registered and 1-2 million unregistered Pashtun Afghan refugees living in refugee camps and settlements along the Afghan-Pakistan border in Pakistan. Many of these refugees have lived there since the Soviet–Afghan War.

Abdel Qadir, an Afghan refugee who returned to Afghanistan, says Pakistan's Inter-Services Intelligence had asked him to either receive training to join the Afghan Taliban or for him and his family to leave the country. He explains, "It is a step-by-step process. First they come, they talk to you. They ask you for the information. Then, gradually they ask you for people they can train and send [to Afghanistan]. They say, 'Either you do what we say, or you leave the country.'"

Janat Gul, another former refugee who returned to Afghanistan, told the UN Office for the Coordination of Humanitarian Affairs that Afghan refugees who had been successfully recruited by the ISI were taken to Pakistani training camps that had been used during the Soviet war in Afghanistan.

According to a New York Times investigative report among Afghan refugees inside Pakistan, people testified that "dozens of families had lost sons in Afghanistan as suicide bombers and fighters" and "families whose sons had died as suicide bombers in Afghanistan said they were afraid to talk about the deaths because of pressure from Pakistani intelligence agents, the ISI."

Pakistani and Afghan tribal elders also testified that the ISI was arresting or even killing Taliban members who wanted to quit fighting and refused to re-enlist to fight in Afghanistan or to die as suicide bombers. One former Taliban commander told The New York Times that such arrests were then portrayed to Westerners and others as part of a supposed Pakistani collaboration effort in the War against Terror.

=== Provision of safe haven ===
Gen. James L. Jones, then NATO's supreme commander, in September 2007 testified in front of the U.S. Senate Foreign Relations Committee that the Afghan Taliban movement uses the Pakistani city of Quetta as their main headquarters. Pakistan's Minister for Information and Broadcasting, Tariq Azim Khan, mocked the statement, saying, if there were any Taliban in Quetta, "you can count them on your fingers."

=== Training ===
From 2002 until 2004 Afghanistan witnessed relative calm without major Taliban activities. Afghan civilians and foreigners were able to freely walk the streets of major cities, and reconstruction was initiated. The 2010 testimonies of former Taliban commanders show Pakistan's ISI was "actively encouraging a Taliban revival" from 2004 to 2006. The effort to reintroduce the Afghan Taliban militarily in Afghanistan was preceded by a two-year, large-scale training campaign of Taliban fighters and leaders conducted by the ISI in several training camps in Quetta and other places in Pakistan. From 2004 to 2006, the Afghan Taliban started a deadly insurgency campaign in Afghanistan, killing thousands of combatants and civilians, renewing and escalating the War in Afghanistan (2001–2021). One Taliban commander involved in the Taliban resurgence said that 80 percent of his fighters had been trained in an ISI camp.

== Haqqani network ==
The ISI has close links to the Haqqani network and contributes heavily to their funding. U.S. Chairman of the Joint Chiefs of Staff Admiral Mike Mullen in 2011 called the Haqqani network (the Afghan Taliban's most destructive element) a "veritable arm of Pakistan's ISI". He further stated:

"Extremist organizations serving as proxies of the government of Pakistan are attacking Afghan troops and civilians as well as US soldiers."

— Former U.S. Chairman of the Joint Chiefs of Staff Mike Mullen, 2011

Mullen said the U.S. had evidence that the ISI directly planned and spearheaded the Haqqani 2011 assault on the U.S. embassy, the June 28 Haqqani attack against the Inter-Continental Hotel in Kabul, and other operations. It is widely believed that the suicide attack on the Indian embassy in Kabul was planned with the help of the ISI. A report in 2008 from the Director of National Intelligence stated that the ISI provides intelligence and funding to help with attacks against the International Security Assistance Force, the Afghan government and Indian targets. According to the Carnegie Endowment Center, the Inter-Services Intelligence Directorate shares an undeniable link with the Taliban, especially the Haqqani group. According to the Hindustan Times, after the 2021 Fall of Kabul, the "ISI (is) orchestrating the power play in Kabul through the Haqqani family terror company."

== Al-Qaeda ==
Besides supporting the Hezb-e Islami of Gulbuddin Hekmatyar, the ISI, in conjunction with Saudi Arabia, strongly supported the faction of Jalaluddin Haqqani (Haqqani network) and allied Arab groups such as the one surrounding financier Bin Laden, currently called Al-Qaeda, during the war against the Soviets and the Afghan communist government in Afghanistan in the 1980s.

In 2000, British Intelligence reported that the ISI was taking an active role in several Al Qaeda training camps from the 1990s onwards. The ISI helped with the construction of training camps for both the Taliban and Al Qaeda. From 1996 to 2001, the Al Qaeda of Osama bin Laden and Ayman al-Zawahiri became a state within the Pakistan-supported Taliban state. Bin Laden sent Arab and Central Asian Al-Qaeda militants to join the Taliban's and Pakistan's fight against the United Front (Northern Alliance), among them his Brigade 055.

The former Afghan intelligence chief Amrullah Saleh has repeatedly stated that Afghan intelligence believed and had shared information about Osama bin Laden hiding in an area close to Abbottabad, Pakistan, four years before bin Laden was killed there. Saleh had shared the information with Pakistani President Pervez Musharraf who had brushed off the claim, taking no action.

In 2007, the Afghans identified two Al-Qaeda safe houses in Mansehra, a town just miles from Abbottabad, leading them to believe that bin Laden was possibly hiding there. Amrullah Saleh said that Pakistani President Pervez Musharraf smashed his fist on a table in frustration when Saleh presented the information to him during a meeting in which Afghan President Hamid Karzai also took part. According to Saleh, "He said, 'Am I the president of the Republic of Banana?' Then he turned to President Karzai and said, 'Why have you brought this Panjshiri guy to teach me intelligence?'"

A December 2011 analysis report by the Jamestown Foundation came to the conclusion that in spite of denials by the Pakistani military, evidence was emerging that elements within the Pakistani military harboured Osama bin Laden with the knowledge of former army chief General Pervez Musharraf and possibly current Chief of Army Staff (COAS) General Ashfaq Pervez Kayani. Former Pakistani Army Chief General Ziauddin Butt (General Ziauddin Khawaja) revealed at a conference on Pakistani–U.S. relations in October 2011 that according to his knowledge the then former Director-General of Intelligence Bureau of Pakistan (2004–2008), Brigadier Ijaz Shah (retd.), had kept Osama bin Laden in an Intelligence Bureau safe house in Abbottabad." Pakistani General Ziauddin Butt said Bin Laden had been hidden in Abbottabad "with the full knowledge" of Pervez Musharraf. Later, Butt denied making any such statement.

During the raid on the compound, US Navy SEALs were able to recover roughly 470,000 computer files from a ten hard drives, five computers, and around one hundred thumb drives and disks. The documents recovered from the compound contained nothing to support the idea that bin Laden was protected by Pakistani officials or that he was in communication with them. Instead, the documents contained criticism of Pakistani military and future plans for attacks against Pakistani military targets. Steve Coll confirmed that as of 2019 no direct evidence showing Pakistani knowledge of bin Laden's presence in Abbottabad had been found, and that captured documents from the Abbottabad compound suggest bin Laden was wary of contact with Pakistani intelligence and police, especially in light of Pakistan's role in the arrest of Khalid Sheikh Mohammed.

== Assassination of pivotal Afghan leaders ==
The ISI has been involved in assassinations of major Afghan leaders which have been described as pivotal for the future of Afghanistan. Among those leaders are the prominent anti-Taliban resistance leader and National Hero of Afghanistan Ahmad Shah Massoud and the Pashtun Anti-Soviet and anti-Taliban resistance leader Abdul Haq. The ISI has also been accused of involvement in the murder of former Afghan president and chief of the Karzai administration's High Peace Council Burhanuddin Rabbani and several other anti-Taliban leaders.

Massoud was killed by two Arab suicide bombers two days before the September 11, 2001 attacks in the United States. The assassins-- supposed journalists--were granted multiple-entry visas valid for a year in early 2001 by Pakistan's embassy in London. As an author and Afghanistan expert, Sandy Gall writes that multiple visas for a year are "unheard of for journalists normally". The ISI subsequently facilitated the two men's passage through Pakistan over the Afghan border into Taliban territory. Afghan journalist Fahim Dashty says, "Al-Qaida, the Taliban, other terrorists, the Pakistan security services -- they were all working together ... to kill him."

Abdul Haq, who was killed by the Taliban on October 26, 2001 and enjoyed strong popular support among Afghanistan's Pashtuns, wanted to create and support a popular uprising against the Taliban - also dominantly Pashtuns - among the Pashtuns. Observers believe that the Taliban were only able to capture him with the collaboration of the ISI. The ISI may have previously been involved in the January 1999 murder of Haq's family members in Peshawar.

Ahmad Shah Massoud had been the only resistance leader able to defend vast parts of his territory against the Taliban, Al-Qaeda, and the Pakistani military. He was sheltering hundreds of thousands of refugees who had fled the Taliban in his controlled territory. Massoud had been seen as the leader most likely to lead post-Taliban Afghanistan. After his assassination, Abdul Haq was seen as one of the main contenders for that position. He had private American backers who had facilitated his re-entry into Afghanistan after 9/11. But journalists reported on tensions between the CIA and Haq. Former CIA director George Tenet reports that, at the recommendation of one of Haq's private American lobbyists Bud McFarlane, CIA officials met with Abdul Haq in Pakistan, but after assessing him, urged him not to enter Afghanistan.

Both leaders, Massoud and Haq, were recognized for being fiercely independent from foreign influence, especially from Pakistan. Both of the most successful anti-Soviet resistance leaders rejected the Pakistani claim of hegemony over the Afghan mujahideen. Abdul Haq was quoted as saying during the anti-Soviet period: "How is that we Afghans, who never lost a war, must take military instructions from the Pakistanis, who never won one?" Massoud, during the Soviet period, said to the Pakistani Foreign Minister who had asked him to send a message to the Russians through the Pakistanis who were conducting talks "on behalf of our Afghan brethren": "Why should I send a message? Why are you talking on our behalf? Don't we have leaders here to talk on our behalf?" Khan replied, "This is how it has been and how it will be. Do you have a message?" Massoud told the foreign minister that "nobody who talks on our behalf will have any kind of result." Consequently, neither Massoud nor Abdul Haq was consulted beforehand, and neither participated in the Battle of Jalalabad (1989) in which the ISI tried but failed to install Gulbuddin Hekmatyar as the post-communist leader of Afghanistan.

== See also ==
- CIA activities in Afghanistan
- Inter-Services Intelligence activities in India
- Operation Cyclone
- Pakistan and state-sponsored terrorism
