= Afghanistan–Saudi Arabia relations =

Bilateral relations

- Afghanistan: Saudi Arabia

Diplomatic mission
- Embassy of Afghanistan, Riyadh: Embassy of Saudi Arabia, Kabul

Afghanistan–Saudi Arabia relations are the bilateral relations between the Islamic Emirate of Afghanistan and the Kingdom of Saudi Arabia.

Saudi Arabia has tried to influence the outcomes of the Afghan conflict by providing support to different belligerents and governments over time. The two countries maintain embassies in each other's capitals, with Afghanistan also operating a consulate general in the Kingdom.

== History ==
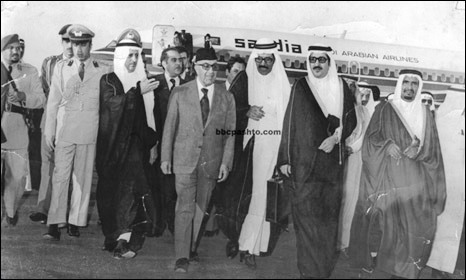
Muhammad Daoud Khan with a group of Saudi officials.

=== Soviet–Afghan War ===
Saudi Arabia has historically exerted a strong influence on Afghanistan and was one of the major providers of funds to the Afghan mujahideen fighting against the Soviets and their allies the DRA.

=== First Taliban government (1996–2001) ===
Saudi Arabia was also the second of only three countries to recognize the first Taliban government, extending official recognition on 26 May 1997, one day after Pakistan and shortly before the United Arab Emirates.

=== War in Afghanistan (2001–2021) ===
After the 2001 invasion of Afghanistan, Saudi Arabia was one of the major helpers in the Afghan reconstruction. For example, the main highway project was funded mainly by the United States and Saudi Arabia. The Grand Mosque of Kabul in Afghanistan was also financed by Saudi Arabia.

The Saudis started perceiving a growing Iranian encroachment in Afghanistan c. 2013. They saw the Iranian Revolutionary Guards supporting Shias, but also one of several Afghan branches of the Muslim Brotherhood, Jamaat-e-Islami, and trying to coopt Taliban leaders and groups, and decided to become more active to counter that.

=== Second Taliban government (2021–present) ===
In August 2021, Saudi Arabia evacuated all of its diplomats from its embassy in Kabul after the Taliban captured the country in a swift sweep. Like the rest of the world (except Russia), Saudi Arabia does not recognize the re-established Islamic Emirate of Afghanistan; however, the Saudi embassy Kabul re-opened on 30 November 2021 to provide consular services to Afghan citizens. On February 5, 2023, the Saudi Arabian embassy in Kabul was evacuated following reports that explosive-laden vehicles had managed to infiltrate Kabul's Green Zone, where the embassy is located. It was also revealed that the terrorist group ISIL had intended to attack the Saudi Arabian embassy during this incident.

==== Energy cooperation ====
In September 2026, Afghanistan's Ministry of Mines and Petroleum signed a deal with Saudi Arabia's Delta International Energy for the exploration and extraction of hydrocarbons from the Kushk-Tirpul basin in the western part of the country and the construction of a gas pipeline network from the Guzara district in Herat to Spin Boldak in Kandahar. The pipeline was planned to be 700-km long, with the whole project valued by the ministry at $200 million. The exploration phase was set to last eight years, while the contract was signed for a period of 25 years.

== Embassies and consulates ==
- Afghanistan has an embassy in Riyadh and a consulate-general in Jeddah.
- Saudi Arabia has an embassy in Kabul.
