= 1980 United States presidential election in California =

- November 4, 1980
- Turnout: 77.24% (of registered voters) ▼4.29 pp 57.04% (of eligible voters) ▼0.28 pp

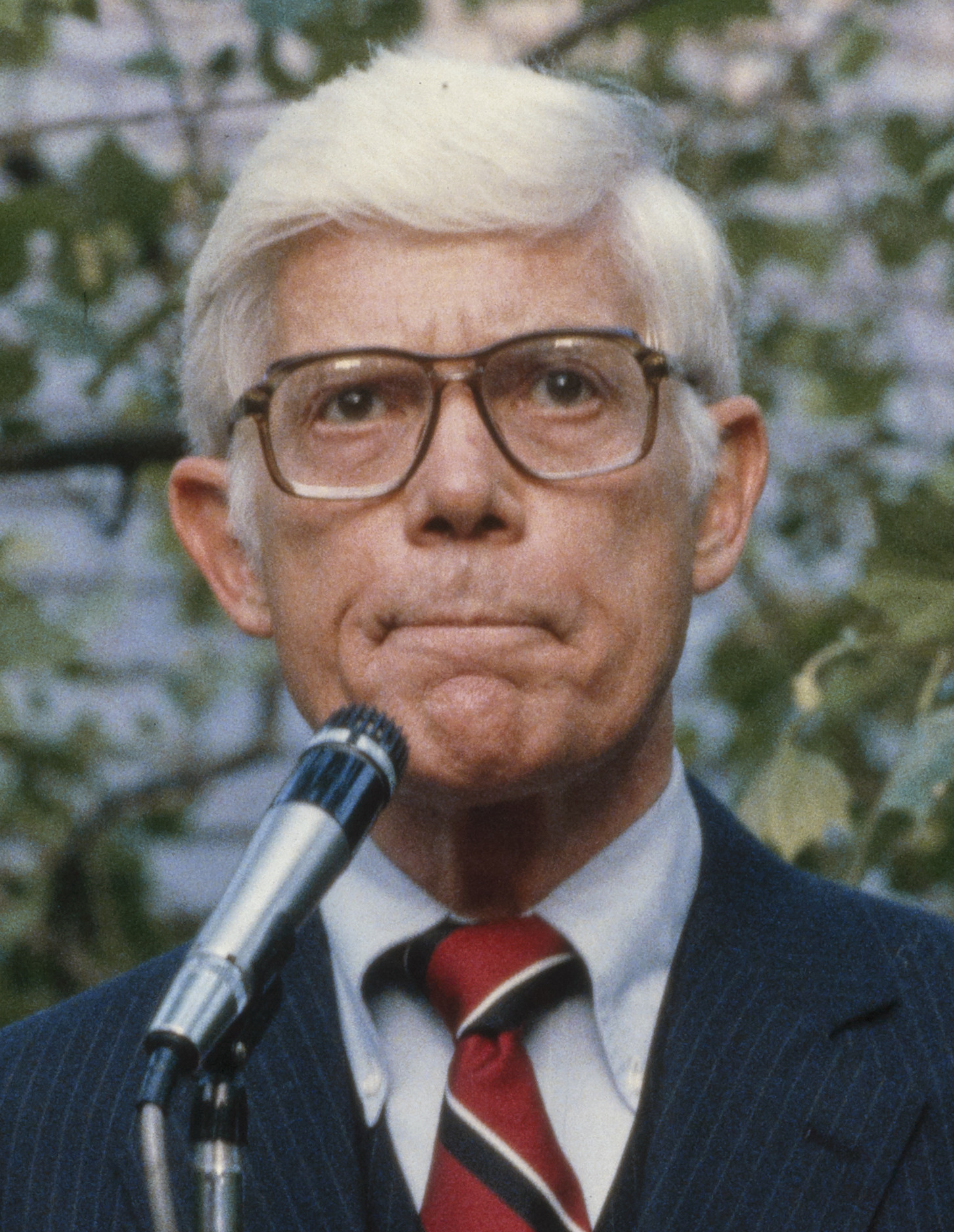
Nominee	Ronald Reagan	Jimmy Carter	John B. Anderson
Party	Republican	Democratic	Independent
Home state	California	Georgia	Illinois
Running mate	George H. W. Bush	Walter Mondale	Patrick Lucey
Electoral vote	45	0	0
Popular vote	4,524,858	3,083,661	739,833
Percentage	52.69%	35.91%	8.62%
County results
Reagan
40–50%
50–60%
60–70%
Carter
40–50%
50–60%
President before election
Jimmy Carter
Democratic
Elected President
Ronald Reagan
Republican

The 1980 United States presidential election in California took place on November 4, 1980, as part of the 1980 United States presidential election. State voters chose 45 representatives, or electors, to the Electoral College, who voted for president and vice president.

California voted for the Republican nominee, the state's former governor Ronald Reagan, in a landslide over the Democratic incumbent, Jimmy Carter. As expected, Reagan won his home state by a wide 16.78% point margin and carried all but three counties. Carter carried only three of the state's 58 counties: Alameda, San Francisco and Yolo.

As of the 2024 presidential election, this is the last time for a Republican candidate to carry the counties of Marin and Santa Cruz in a presidential election. This election was also the most Republican California has voted relative to the whole nation since 1928 and was the last time it was more Republican than the nation as a whole. It was widely believed that Carter lacked understanding of critical Western issues, most importantly water development. This also remains the last time a Republican won the San Francisco Bay Area, and the last one in which San Francisco gave less than 60% of the vote to the Democratic candidate.

== Primaries ==
1980 Democratic Primary
Candidate	Votes	Delegates
Ted Kennedy	1,507,142	151
Jimmy Carter (incumbent)	1,266,216	127
Jerry Brown	135,962	0
Others	71,779	0
Uncommitted	382,759	38
Totals	3,363,858	317

1980 Republican Primary
Candidate	Votes	Delegates
Ronald Reagan	2,057,923	146
John Anderson	349,315	25
George H.W. Bush	125,113	0
Others	31,707	0
Totals	2,564,058	171

== Results ==
1980 United States presidential election in California
Party	Candidate	Votes	Percentage	Electoral votes
Republican	Ronald Reagan	4,524,858	52.69%	45
Democratic	Jimmy Carter (incumbent)	3,083,661	35.91%	0
Independent	John B. Anderson	739,833	8.62%	0
Libertarian	Ed Clark	148,434	1.73%	0
Independent	Barry Commoner	61,063	0.71%	0
Peace and Freedom	Maureen Smith	18,116	0.21%	0
American Independent	John Rarick	9,856	0.11%	0
No party	Gus Hall (write-in)	847	0.01%	0
No party	Andrew Pulley (write-in)	231	0.00%	0
No party	Percy Greaves, Jr. (write-in)	87	0.00%	0
No party	Ben Bubar (write-in)	36	0.00%	0
No party	Write-ins	26	0.00%	0
No party	Deirdre Griswold (write-in)	15	0.00%	0
Invalid or blank votes				—
Totals		8,587,063	100.00%	45
Voter turnout				—

=== Results by county ===
County	Ronald Reagan Republican		Jimmy Carter Democratic		John B. Anderson Independent		Various candidates Other parties		Margin		Total votes cast
County	#	%	#	%	#	%	#	%	#	%	Total votes cast
Alameda	158,531	37.96%	201,720	48.30%	40,834	9.78%	16,532	3.96%	-43,189	-10.34%	417,617
Alpine	254	55.10%	133	28.85%	50	10.85%	24	5.21%	121	26.25%	461
Amador	5,401	55.85%	3,191	33.00%	788	8.15%	290	3.00%	2,210	22.85%	9,670
Butte	38,188	57.85%	19,520	29.57%	6,108	9.25%	2,196	3.33%	18,668	28.28%	66,012
Calaveras	6,054	58.92%	3,076	29.94%	776	7.55%	369	3.59%	2,978	28.98%	10,275
Colusa	2,897	58.00%	1,605	32.13%	325	6.51%	168	3.36%	1,292	25.87%	4,995
Contra Costa	144,112	50.12%	107,398	37.35%	28,209	9.81%	7,826	2.72%	36,714	12.77%	287,545
Del Norte	4,016	57.48%	2,338	33.46%	486	6.96%	147	2.10%	1,678	24.02%	6,987
El Dorado	21,238	58.27%	10,765	29.53%	3,287	9.02%	1,159	3.18%	10,473	28.74%	36,449
Fresno	82,515	51.13%	65,254	40.43%	10,727	6.65%	2,890	1.79%	17,261	10.70%	161,386
Glenn	5,386	64.80%	2,227	26.79%	537	6.46%	162	1.95%	3,159	38.01%	8,312
Humboldt	24,047	49.39%	17,113	35.15%	5,440	11.17%	2,092	4.30%	6,934	14.24%	48,692
Imperial	12,068	55.92%	7,961	36.89%	1,203	5.57%	347	1.61%	4,107	19.03%	21,579
Inyo	5,201	64.79%	2,080	25.91%	515	6.42%	231	2.88%	3,121	38.88%	8,027
Kern	72,842	59.65%	41,097	33.65%	5,799	4.75%	2,383	1.95%	31,745	26.00%	122,121
Kings	10,531	55.37%	7,299	38.37%	901	4.74%	290	1.52%	3,232	17.00%	19,021
Lake	8,934	53.64%	5,978	35.90%	1,157	6.95%	585	3.51%	2,956	17.74%	16,654
Lassen	4,464	54.45%	2,941	35.87%	543	6.62%	250	3.05%	1,523	18.58%	8,198
Los Angeles	1,224,533	50.18%	979,830	40.15%	175,882	7.21%	59,940	2.46%	244,703	10.03%	2,440,185
Madera	10,599	53.58%	7,783	39.35%	1,013	5.12%	385	1.95%	2,816	14.23%	19,780
Marin	49,678	45.78%	39,231	36.16%	13,805	12.72%	5,793	5.34%	10,447	9.62%	108,507
Mariposa	3,082	54.96%	1,889	33.68%	458	8.17%	179	3.19%	1,193	21.28%	5,608
Mendocino	12,432	44.05%	10,784	38.21%	2,747	9.73%	2,261	8.01%	1,648	5.84%	28,224
Merced	18,043	48.77%	15,886	42.94%	2,316	6.26%	751	2.03%	2,157	5.83%	36,996
Modoc	2,579	64.48%	1,046	26.15%	293	7.32%	82	2.05%	1,533	38.33%	4,000
Mono	2,132	62.32%	865	25.29%	302	8.83%	122	3.57%	1,267	37.03%	3,421
Monterey	47,452	54.67%	29,086	33.51%	8,008	9.23%	2,248	2.59%	18,366	21.16%	86,794
Napa	23,632	53.67%	14,898	33.83%	4,218	9.58%	1,287	2.92%	8,734	19.84%	44,035
Nevada	15,207	57.91%	7,605	28.96%	2,235	8.51%	1,214	4.62%	7,602	28.95%	26,261
Orange	529,797	67.90%	176,704	22.65%	55,299	7.09%	18,412	2.36%	353,093	45.25%	780,212
Placer	28,179	54.78%	17,311	33.65%	4,356	8.47%	1,594	3.10%	10,868	21.13%	51,440
Plumas	4,182	51.24%	2,911	35.67%	783	9.59%	285	3.49%	1,271	15.57%	8,161
Riverside	145,642	59.87%	76,650	31.51%	16,362	6.73%	4,624	1.90%	68,992	28.36%	243,278
Sacramento	153,721	47.72%	130,031	40.37%	29,655	9.21%	8,713	2.70%	23,690	7.35%	322,120
San Benito	4,054	53.33%	2,749	36.16%	552	7.26%	247	3.25%	1,305	17.17%	7,602
San Bernardino	172,957	59.68%	91,790	31.67%	19,106	6.59%	5,959	2.06%	81,167	28.01%	289,812
San Diego	435,910	60.81%	195,410	27.26%	67,491	9.41%	18,055	2.52%	240,500	33.55%	716,866
San Francisco	80,967	31.87%	133,184	52.43%	29,365	11.56%	10,512	4.14%	-52,217	-20.56%	254,028
San Joaquin	64,718	55.38%	41,551	35.56%	8,416	7.20%	2,178	1.86%	23,167	19.82%	116,863
San Luis Obispo	38,631	55.56%	20,508	29.50%	8,407	12.09%	1,981	2.85%	18,123	26.06%	69,527
San Mateo	116,491	48.82%	87,335	36.60%	27,985	11.73%	6,826	2.86%	29,156	12.22%	238,637
Santa Barbara	69,629	53.98%	40,650	31.51%	14,786	11.46%	3,930	3.05%	28,979	22.47%	128,995
Santa Clara	229,048	48.02%	166,995	35.01%	65,481	13.73%	15,479	3.25%	62,053	13.01%	477,003
Santa Cruz	37,347	43.53%	32,346	37.70%	10,590	12.34%	5,521	6.43%	5,001	5.83%	85,804
Shasta	27,547	58.09%	15,364	32.40%	3,220	6.79%	1,287	2.71%	12,183	25.69%	47,418
Sierra	855	49.77%	651	37.89%	156	9.08%	56	3.26%	204	11.88%	1,718
Siskiyou	9,331	55.75%	5,664	33.84%	1,269	7.58%	474	2.83%	3,667	21.91%	16,738
Solano	40,919	50.72%	30,952	38.37%	6,713	8.32%	2,092	2.59%	9,967	12.35%	80,676
Sonoma	60,722	48.20%	45,596	36.19%	14,068	11.17%	5,599	4.44%	15,126	12.01%	125,985
Stanislaus	41,595	49.41%	33,683	40.01%	7,134	8.47%	1,774	2.11%	7,912	9.40%	84,186
Sutter	11,778	63.47%	5,103	27.50%	1,089	5.87%	587	3.16%	6,675	35.97%	18,557
Tehama	9,140	59.13%	4,832	31.26%	1,014	6.56%	471	3.05%	4,308	27.87%	15,457
Trinity	3,048	54.96%	1,734	31.27%	506	9.12%	258	4.65%	1,314	23.69%	5,546
Tulare	41,317	58.32%	25,155	35.51%	3,244	4.58%	1,130	1.60%	16,162	22.81%	70,846
Tuolumne	8,810	54.85%	5,449	33.92%	1,390	8.65%	414	2.58%	3,361	20.93%	16,063
Ventura	114,930	60.28%	56,311	29.54%	14,887	7.81%	4,522	2.37%	58,619	30.74%	190,650
Yolo	19,603	39.45%	21,527	43.32%	6,669	13.42%	1,891	3.81%	-1,924	-3.87%	49,690
Yuba	7,942	56.28%	4,896	34.70%	878	6.22%	395	2.80%	3,046	21.58%	14,111
Total	4,524,858	52.69%	3,083,661	35.91%	739,833	8.62%	238,711	2.78%	1,441,197	16.78%	8,587,063

==== Counties that flipped from Democratic to Republican ====
- Amador
- Del Norte
- El Dorado
- Fresno
- Humboldt
- Lake
- Lassen
- Los Angeles
- Madera
- Merced
- Mariposa
- Mendocino
- Placer
- Plumas
- Sacramento
- Santa Cruz
- Shasta
- Sierra
- Solano
- Stanislaus
- Tehama
- Trinity
- Tuolumne
- Yuba

=== Results by city ===
Official outcome by city and unincorporated areas of counties, of which Reagan won 395 and Carter won 83.
City	County	Ronald Reagan Republican		Jimmy Carter Democratic		John Anderson Independent		Various candidates Other parties		Margin		Total Votes	1976 to 1980 Swing%
City	County	#	%	#	%	#	%	#	%	#	%	Total Votes	1976 to 1980 Swing%
Alameda	Alameda	11,021	48.75%	8,248	36.48%	2,601	11.51%	737	3.26%	2,773	12.27%	22,607	8.49%
Albany	Alameda	2,068	30.32%	3,583	52.53%	736	10.79%	434	6.36%	-1,515	-22.21%	6,821	-0.81%
Berkeley	Alameda	7,871	14.75%	33,753	63.25%	6,966	13.05%	4,773	8.94%	-25,882	-48.50%	53,363	0.49%
Emeryville	Alameda	442	29.60%	794	53.18%	171	11.45%	86	5.76%	-352	-23.58%	1,493	1.34%
Fremont	Alameda	23,746	54.00%	14,602	33.21%	4,410	10.03%	1,213	2.76%	9,144	20.80%	43,971	27.82%
Hayward	Alameda	12,947	43.90%	12,973	43.98%	2,688	9.11%	887	3.01%	-26	-0.09%	29,495	21.84%
Livermore	Alameda	10,397	56.78%	5,291	28.90%	2,184	11.93%	439	2.40%	5,106	27.88%	18,311	17.76%
Newark	Alameda	4,544	51.03%	3,222	36.18%	893	10.03%	246	2.76%	1,322	14.85%	8,905	31.90%
Oakland	Alameda	26,338	22.87%	75,488	65.53%	9,020	7.83%	4,342	3.77%	-49,150	-42.67%	115,188	-6.02%
Piedmont	Alameda	3,505	61.35%	1,378	24.12%	648	11.34%	182	3.19%	2,127	37.23%	5,713	-7.73%
Pleasanton	Alameda	8,665	61.70%	3,572	25.43%	1,507	10.73%	300	2.14%	5,093	36.26%	14,044	16.67%
San Leandro	Alameda	12,528	48.42%	10,600	40.97%	2,098	8.11%	648	2.50%	1,928	7.45%	25,874	20.22%
Union City	Alameda	4,342	43.13%	4,593	45.62%	881	8.75%	251	2.49%	-251	-2.49%	10,067	23.48%
Unincorporated Area	Alameda	22,451	50.29%	16,606	37.20%	4,216	9.44%	1,367	3.06%	5,845	13.09%	44,640	21.09%
Unapportioned Absentees	Alameda	7,666	44.76%	7,017	40.98%	1,815	10.60%	627	3.66%	649	3.79%	17,125	-0.65%
Unincorporated Area	Alpine	254	55.10%	133	28.85%	50	10.85%	24	5.21%	121	26.25%	461	18.05%
Amador City	Amador	41	62.12%	19	28.79%	6	9.09%	0	0.00%	22	33.33%	66	22.56%
Ione	Amador	381	53.74%	256	36.11%	52	7.33%	20	2.82%	125	17.63%	709	22.11%
Jackson	Amador	603	53.74%	386	34.40%	105	9.36%	28	2.50%	217	19.34%	1,122	13.27%
Plymouth	Amador	158	51.97%	115	37.83%	20	6.58%	11	3.62%	43	14.14%	304	51.29%
Sutter Creek	Amador	442	49.83%	350	39.46%	73	8.23%	22	2.48%	92	10.37%	887	7.81%
Unincorporated Area	Amador	3,332	57.40%	1,807	31.13%	474	8.17%	192	3.31%	1,525	26.27%	5,805	35.30%
Unapportioned Absentees	Amador	444	57.14%	258	33.20%	58	7.46%	17	2.19%	186	23.94%	777	13.75%
Biggs	Butte	256	54.94%	179	38.41%	18	3.86%	13	2.79%	77	16.52%	466	42.50%
Chico	Butte	5,616	43.37%	4,540	35.06%	2,256	17.42%	536	4.14%	1,076	8.31%	12,948	6.70%
Gridley	Butte	676	55.00%	461	37.51%	66	5.37%	26	2.12%	215	17.49%	1,229	12.63%
Oroville	Butte	1,930	57.12%	1,187	35.13%	187	5.53%	75	2.22%	743	21.99%	3,379	18.65%
Paradise	Butte	7,871	65.44%	3,015	25.07%	776	6.45%	366	3.04%	4,856	40.37%	12,028	N/A
Unincorporated Area	Butte	21,839	60.73%	10,138	28.19%	2,805	7.80%	1,180	3.28%	11,701	32.54%	35,962	22.27%
Angels	Calaveras	580	54.98%	359	34.03%	70	6.64%	46	4.36%	221	20.95%	1,055	21.26%
Unincorporated Area	Calaveras	4,852	59.32%	2,411	29.47%	620	7.58%	297	3.63%	2,441	29.84%	8,180	29.31%
Unapportioned Absentees	Calaveras	622	59.81%	306	29.42%	86	8.27%	26	2.50%	316	30.38%	1,040	21.27%
Colusa	Colusa	792	52.69%	540	35.93%	120	7.98%	51	3.39%	252	16.77%	1,503	14.50%
Williams	Colusa	303	55.29%	197	35.95%	32	5.84%	16	2.92%	106	19.34%	548	31.39%
Unincorporated Area	Colusa	1,500	60.63%	744	30.07%	136	5.50%	94	3.80%	756	30.56%	2,474	16.58%
Unapportioned Absentees	Colusa	302	64.26%	124	26.38%	37	7.87%	7	1.49%	178	37.87%	470	20.81%
Antioch	Contra Costa	6,758	44.96%	6,490	43.18%	1,362	9.06%	421	2.80%	268	1.78%	15,031	31.95%
Brentwood	Contra Costa	589	44.62%	603	45.68%	95	7.20%	33	2.50%	-14	-1.06%	1,320	29.32%
Clayton	Contra Costa	1,306	64.49%	504	24.89%	180	8.89%	35	1.73%	802	39.60%	2,025	19.81%
Concord	Contra Costa	20,201	50.44%	14,213	35.49%	4,456	11.13%	1,177	2.94%	5,988	14.95%	40,047	15.06%
El Cerrito	Contra Costa	4,375	37.98%	5,564	48.30%	1,155	10.03%	426	3.70%	-1,189	-10.32%	11,520	-3.78%
Hercules	Contra Costa	919	47.89%	781	40.70%	180	9.38%	39	2.03%	138	7.19%	1,919	6.00%
Lafayette	Contra Costa	6,615	60.46%	2,594	23.71%	1,378	12.59%	354	3.24%	4,021	36.75%	10,941	-0.22%
Martinez	Contra Costa	4,798	47.27%	3,892	38.34%	1,125	11.08%	336	3.31%	906	8.93%	10,151	17.25%
Moraga	Contra Costa	4,972	66.96%	1,490	20.07%	825	11.11%	138	1.86%	3,482	46.90%	7,425	0.57%
Pinole	Contra Costa	3,076	50.67%	2,291	37.74%	517	8.52%	187	3.08%	785	12.93%	6,071	20.74%
Pittsburg	Contra Costa	3,974	35.42%	6,168	54.97%	811	7.23%	268	2.39%	-2,194	-19.55%	11,221	20.41%
Pleasant Hill	Contra Costa	5,552	49.38%	3,903	34.71%	1,435	12.76%	354	3.15%	1,649	14.67%	11,244	11.89%
Richmond	Contra Costa	6,255	24.01%	17,778	68.23%	1,452	5.57%	570	2.19%	-11,523	-44.23%	26,055	0.83%
San Pablo	Contra Costa	1,766	33.90%	2,976	57.13%	339	6.51%	128	2.46%	-1,210	-23.23%	5,209	20.48%
Walnut Creek	Contra Costa	17,337	62.83%	6,677	24.20%	2,978	10.79%	602	2.18%	10,660	38.63%	27,594	1.11%
Unincorporated Area	Contra Costa	45,660	54.92%	26,903	32.36%	8,183	9.84%	2,396	2.88%	18,757	22.56%	83,142	15.20%
Unapportioned Absentees	Contra Costa	9,959	59.89%	4,571	27.49%	1,738	10.45%	362	2.18%	5,388	32.40%	16,630	7.71%
Crescent City	Del Norte	574	54.30%	383	36.23%	80	7.57%	20	1.89%	191	18.07%	1,057	19.63%
Unincorporated Area	Del Norte	2,979	57.35%	1,742	33.54%	362	6.97%	111	2.14%	1,237	23.82%	5,194	30.61%
Unapportioned Absentees	Del Norte	463	62.91%	213	28.94%	44	5.98%	16	2.17%	250	33.97%	736	36.97%
Placerville	El Dorado	1,453	53.91%	908	33.69%	248	9.20%	86	3.19%	545	20.22%	2,695	21.24%
South Lake Tahoe	El Dorado	3,135	54.46%	1,854	32.20%	571	9.92%	197	3.42%	1,281	22.25%	5,757	24.97%
Unincorporated Area	El Dorado	14,909	59.02%	7,316	28.96%	2,228	8.82%	806	3.19%	7,593	30.06%	25,259	32.26%
Unapportioned Absentees	El Dorado	1,741	63.59%	687	25.09%	240	8.77%	70	2.56%	1,054	38.50%	2,738	21.69%
Clovis	Fresno	5,365	54.18%	3,606	36.42%	753	7.60%	178	1.80%	1,759	17.76%	9,902	24.06%
Coalinga	Fresno	986	50.98%	781	40.38%	121	6.26%	46	2.38%	205	10.60%	1,934	16.02%
Firebaugh	Fresno	193	33.39%	349	60.38%	27	4.67%	9	1.56%	-156	-26.99%	578	7.29%
Fowler	Fresno	326	48.88%	297	44.53%	33	4.95%	11	1.65%	29	4.35%	667	2.68%
Fresno	Fresno	30,542	45.75%	29,949	44.86%	4,962	7.43%	1,311	1.96%	593	0.89%	66,764	11.94%
Huron	Fresno	46	16.03%	228	79.44%	6	2.09%	7	2.44%	-182	-63.41%	287	-28.91%
Kerman	Fresno	437	53.03%	341	41.38%	38	4.61%	8	0.97%	96	11.65%	824	27.67%
Kingsburg	Fresno	1,059	59.83%	584	32.99%	105	5.93%	22	1.24%	475	26.84%	1,770	1.65%
Mendota	Fresno	153	25.98%	402	68.25%	17	2.89%	17	2.89%	-249	-42.28%	589	-3.32%
Orange Cove	Fresno	182	27.29%	457	68.52%	14	2.10%	14	2.10%	-275	-41.23%	667	-2.04%
Parlier	Fresno	73	20.33%	271	75.49%	9	2.51%	6	1.67%	-198	-55.15%	359	-18.10%
Reedley	Fresno	1,693	54.90%	1,162	37.68%	183	5.93%	46	1.49%	531	17.22%	3,084	-0.01%
San Joaquin	Fresno	69	41.07%	86	51.19%	9	5.36%	4	2.38%	-17	-10.12%	168	7.67%
Sanger	Fresno	1,112	36.32%	1,779	58.10%	129	4.21%	42	1.37%	-667	-21.78%	3,062	3.46%
Selma	Fresno	1,286	48.26%	1,225	45.97%	121	4.54%	33	1.24%	61	2.29%	2,665	4.51%
Unincorporated Area	Fresno	31,274	57.27%	19,024	34.84%	3,377	6.18%	933	1.71%	12,250	22.43%	54,608	14.02%
Unapportioned Absentees	Fresno	7,719	57.36%	4,713	35.02%	823	6.12%	203	1.51%	3,006	22.34%	13,458	9.89%
Orland	Glenn	945	63.81%	403	27.21%	95	6.41%	38	2.57%	542	36.60%	1,481	27.17%
Willows	Glenn	1,100	60.31%	568	31.14%	124	6.80%	32	1.75%	532	29.17%	1,824	-9.74%
Unincorporated Area	Glenn	2,923	66.55%	1,110	25.27%	274	6.24%	85	1.94%	1,813	41.28%	4,392	44.67%
Unapportioned Absentees	Glenn	418	67.97%	146	23.74%	44	7.15%	7	1.14%	272	44.23%	615	22.37%
Arcata	Humboldt	2,055	31.25%	2,959	45.00%	1,201	18.27%	360	5.48%	-904	-13.75%	6,575	17.86%
Blue Lake	Humboldt	252	44.68%	229	40.60%	51	9.04%	32	5.67%	23	4.08%	564	34.36%
Eureka	Humboldt	5,196	51.84%	3,451	34.43%	1,006	10.04%	370	3.69%	1,745	17.41%	10,023	24.34%
Ferndale	Humboldt	416	63.13%	158	23.98%	65	9.86%	20	3.03%	258	39.15%	659	30.95%
Fortuna	Humboldt	1,887	63.13%	755	25.26%	273	9.13%	74	2.48%	1,132	37.87%	2,989	27.14%
Rio Dell	Humboldt	555	62.57%	252	28.41%	59	6.65%	21	2.37%	303	34.16%	887	47.92%
Trinidad	Humboldt	85	38.64%	87	39.55%	26	11.82%	22	10.00%	-2	-0.91%	220	43.54%
Unincorporated Area	Humboldt	11,555	49.92%	8,103	35.01%	2,423	10.47%	1,066	4.61%	3,452	14.91%	23,147	28.93%
Unapportioned Absentees	Humboldt	2,046	56.09%	1,139	31.22%	336	9.21%	127	3.48%	907	24.86%	3,648	22.02%
Brawley	Imperial	1,932	54.35%	1,407	39.58%	170	4.78%	46	1.29%	525	14.77%	3,555	14.69%
Calexico	Imperial	521	27.71%	1,208	64.26%	129	6.86%	22	1.17%	-687	-36.54%	1,880	-0.77%
Calipatria	Imperial	215	47.88%	200	44.54%	23	5.12%	11	2.45%	15	3.34%	449	9.41%
El Centro	Imperial	3,460	58.05%	1,978	33.19%	431	7.23%	91	1.53%	1,482	24.87%	5,960	13.87%
Holtville	Imperial	615	60.00%	335	32.68%	60	5.85%	15	1.46%	280	27.32%	1,025	20.18%
Imperial	Imperial	661	62.42%	310	29.27%	69	6.52%	19	1.79%	351	33.14%	1,059	36.21%
Westmorland	Imperial	132	45.83%	135	46.88%	18	6.25%	3	1.04%	-3	-1.04%	288	17.41%
Unincorporated Area	Imperial	3,660	60.66%	2,014	33.38%	236	3.91%	124	2.06%	1,646	27.28%	6,034	25.05%
Unapportioned Absentees	Imperial	872	65.61%	374	28.14%	67	5.04%	16	1.20%	498	37.47%	1,329	9.34%
Bishop	Inyo	1,002	67.89%	352	23.85%	86	5.83%	36	2.44%	650	44.04%	1,476	17.71%
Unincorporated Area	Inyo	3,690	64.05%	1,517	26.33%	374	6.49%	180	3.12%	2,173	37.72%	5,761	22.71%
Unapportioned Absentees	Inyo	509	64.43%	211	26.71%	55	6.96%	15	1.90%	298	37.72%	790	2.57%
Arvin	Kern	408	40.04%	580	56.92%	19	1.86%	12	1.18%	-172	-16.88%	1,019	7.21%
Bakersfield	Kern	20,995	60.14%	11,390	32.63%	1,796	5.14%	729	2.09%	9,605	27.51%	34,910	13.41%
California City	Kern	620	61.75%	317	31.57%	43	4.28%	24	2.39%	303	30.18%	1,004	39.06%
Delano	Kern	1,646	45.42%	1,827	50.41%	115	3.17%	36	0.99%	-181	-4.99%	3,624	4.66%
Maricopa	Kern	162	64.29%	77	30.56%	6	2.38%	7	2.78%	85	33.73%	252	54.28%
McFarland	Kern	351	42.09%	460	55.16%	15	1.80%	8	0.96%	-109	-13.07%	834	10.03%
Ridgecrest	Kern	4,002	64.69%	1,478	23.89%	548	8.86%	158	2.55%	2,524	40.80%	6,186	24.56%
Shafter	Kern	1,119	61.35%	623	34.16%	52	2.85%	30	1.64%	496	27.19%	1,824	14.30%
Taft	Kern	1,217	64.32%	560	29.60%	94	4.97%	21	1.11%	657	34.73%	1,892	22.82%
Tehachapi	Kern	840	58.62%	473	33.01%	83	5.79%	37	2.58%	367	25.61%	1,433	25.47%
Wasco	Kern	1,003	53.78%	797	42.73%	47	2.52%	18	0.97%	206	11.05%	1,865	11.72%
Unincorporated Area	Kern	35,377	59.59%	20,291	34.18%	2,521	4.25%	1,175	1.98%	15,086	25.41%	59,364	22.13%
Unapportioned Absentees	Kern	5,102	64.47%	2,224	28.10%	460	5.81%	128	1.62%	2,878	36.37%	7,914	12.47%
Avenal	Kings	366	43.88%	410	49.16%	41	4.92%	17	2.04%	-44	-5.28%	834	N/A
Corcoran	Kings	726	50.28%	644	44.60%	50	3.46%	24	1.66%	82	5.68%	1,444	14.54%
Hanford	Kings	3,176	53.52%	2,333	39.32%	327	5.51%	98	1.65%	843	14.21%	5,934	12.51%
Lemoore	Kings	1,396	59.73%	752	32.18%	142	6.08%	47	2.01%	644	27.56%	2,337	21.54%
Unincorporated Area	Kings	3,963	56.31%	2,716	38.59%	271	3.85%	88	1.25%	1,247	17.72%	7,038	17.76%
Unapportioned Absentees	Kings	904	63.04%	444	30.96%	70	4.88%	16	1.12%	460	32.08%	1,434	15.70%
Lakeport	Lake	959	56.25%	567	33.26%	134	7.86%	45	2.64%	392	22.99%	1,705	16.52%
Unincorporated Area	Lake	7,173	52.68%	5,002	36.73%	941	6.91%	501	3.68%	2,171	15.94%	13,617	26.55%
Unapportioned Absentees	Lake	802	60.21%	409	30.71%	82	6.16%	39	2.93%	393	29.50%	1,332	23.72%
Susanville	Lassen	1,177	46.56%	1,070	42.33%	203	8.03%	78	3.09%	107	4.23%	2,528	20.88%
Unincorporated Area	Lassen	2,912	57.53%	1,682	33.23%	308	6.08%	160	3.16%	1,230	24.30%	5,062	34.38%
Unapportioned Absentees	Lassen	375	61.68%	189	31.09%	32	5.26%	12	1.97%	186	30.59%	608	25.52%
Alhambra	Los Angeles	11,296	54.32%	7,614	36.61%	1,447	6.96%	438	2.11%	3,682	17.71%	20,795	7.21%
Arcadia	Los Angeles	17,155	74.59%	4,171	18.14%	1,300	5.65%	373	1.62%	12,984	56.45%	22,999	7.15%
Artesia	Los Angeles	1,851	57.11%	1,170	36.10%	175	5.40%	45	1.39%	681	21.01%	3,241	22.91%
Avalon	Los Angeles	538	60.31%	252	28.25%	68	7.62%	34	3.81%	286	32.06%	892	-0.49%
Azusa	Los Angeles	3,771	54.53%	2,572	37.19%	453	6.55%	119	1.72%	1,199	17.34%	6,915	26.55%
Baldwin Park	Los Angeles	4,190	48.63%	3,782	43.90%	473	5.49%	171	1.98%	408	4.74%	8,616	26.81%
Bell	Los Angeles	2,129	54.37%	1,582	40.40%	142	3.63%	63	1.61%	547	13.97%	3,916	26.17%
Bell Gardens	Los Angeles	1,399	46.05%	1,412	46.48%	166	5.46%	61	2.01%	-13	-0.43%	3,038	35.72%
Bellflower	Los Angeles	9,618	60.28%	5,131	32.16%	894	5.60%	312	1.96%	4,487	28.12%	15,955	29.68%
Beverly Hills	Los Angeles	7,344	47.65%	6,111	39.65%	1,625	10.54%	332	2.15%	1,233	8.00%	15,412	13.10%
Bradbury	Los Angeles	327	81.14%	47	11.66%	18	4.47%	11	2.73%	280	69.48%	403	20.13%
Burbank	Los Angeles	21,641	63.83%	9,333	27.53%	2,226	6.57%	704	2.08%	12,308	36.30%	33,904	16.79%
Carson	Los Angeles	7,850	34.43%	13,518	59.28%	1,080	4.74%	355	1.56%	-5,668	-24.86%	22,803	15.48%
Cerritos	Los Angeles	9,967	61.51%	5,004	30.88%	985	6.08%	249	1.54%	4,963	30.63%	16,205	19.54%
Claremont	Los Angeles	6,824	52.85%	4,286	33.19%	1,482	11.48%	321	2.49%	2,538	19.65%	12,913	4.66%
Commerce	Los Angeles	570	26.56%	1,402	65.33%	135	6.29%	39	1.82%	-832	-38.77%	2,146	15.60%
Compton	Los Angeles	867	4.87%	16,514	92.82%	309	1.74%	102	0.57%	-15,647	-87.94%	17,792	-3.04%
Covina	Los Angeles	8,413	67.30%	3,037	24.29%	800	6.40%	251	2.01%	5,376	43.00%	12,501	21.19%
Cudahy	Los Angeles	739	47.04%	733	46.66%	72	4.58%	27	1.72%	6	0.38%	1,571	25.88%
Culver City	Los Angeles	6,952	45.66%	6,420	42.17%	1,382	9.08%	471	3.09%	532	3.49%	15,225	8.65%
Downey	Los Angeles	21,029	65.14%	8,899	27.56%	1,769	5.48%	588	1.82%	12,130	37.57%	32,285	19.43%
Duarte	Los Angeles	2,717	59.19%	1,465	31.92%	300	6.54%	108	2.35%	1,252	27.28%	4,590	20.25%
El Monte	Los Angeles	6,729	50.46%	5,525	41.43%	803	6.02%	278	2.08%	1,204	9.03%	13,335	21.46%
El Segundo	Los Angeles	4,026	66.02%	1,415	23.20%	468	7.67%	189	3.10%	2,611	42.82%	6,098	9.83%
Gardena	Los Angeles	5,250	41.38%	6,500	51.23%	720	5.67%	218	1.72%	-1,250	-9.85%	12,688	4.27%
Glendale	Los Angeles	35,919	69.39%	11,538	22.29%	3,208	6.20%	1,098	2.12%	24,381	47.10%	51,763	11.01%
Glendora	Los Angeles	10,817	72.42%	2,943	19.70%	899	6.02%	277	1.85%	7,874	52.72%	14,936	21.24%
Hawaiian Gardens	Los Angeles	770	44.41%	813	46.89%	115	6.63%	36	2.08%	-43	-2.48%	1,734	33.48%
Hawthorne	Los Angeles	8,496	53.59%	6,030	38.03%	994	6.27%	334	2.11%	2,466	15.55%	15,854	13.70%
Hermosa Beach	Los Angeles	4,098	51.03%	2,511	31.27%	1,009	12.56%	413	5.14%	1,587	19.76%	8,031	7.90%
Hidden Hills	Los Angeles	568	72.17%	133	16.90%	67	8.51%	19	2.41%	435	55.27%	787	7.47%
Huntington Park	Los Angeles	2,468	48.84%	2,283	45.18%	237	4.69%	65	1.29%	185	3.66%	5,053	11.21%
Industry	Los Angeles	29	59.18%	19	38.78%	1	2.04%	0	0.00%	10	20.41%	49	-4.89%
Inglewood	Los Angeles	5,988	24.17%	17,442	70.41%	980	3.96%	362	1.46%	-11,454	-46.24%	24,772	-11.71%
Irwindale	Los Angeles	63	28.13%	149	66.52%	9	4.02%	3	1.34%	-86	-38.39%	224	3.95%
La Cañada Flintridge	Los Angeles	8,253	75.14%	1,630	14.84%	863	7.86%	237	2.16%	6,623	60.30%	10,983	N/A
La Habra Heights	Los Angeles	1,883	77.17%	341	13.98%	155	6.35%	61	2.50%	1,542	63.20%	2,440	N/A
La Mirada	Los Angeles	10,366	66.15%	4,103	26.18%	900	5.74%	302	1.93%	6,263	39.97%	15,671	20.09%
La Puente	Los Angeles	2,616	43.35%	2,978	49.35%	322	5.34%	119	1.97%	-362	-6.00%	6,035	22.55%
La Verne	Los Angeles	6,377	65.11%	2,577	26.31%	649	6.63%	191	1.95%	3,800	38.80%	9,794	19.29%
Lakewood	Los Angeles	17,608	59.37%	9,562	32.24%	1,915	6.46%	571	1.93%	8,046	27.13%	29,656	25.87%
Lancaster	Los Angeles	12,627	71.21%	3,758	21.19%	997	5.62%	349	1.97%	8,869	50.02%	17,731	N/A
Lawndale	Los Angeles	2,822	54.57%	1,817	35.14%	381	7.37%	151	2.92%	1,005	19.44%	5,171	24.94%
Lomita	Los Angeles	3,615	59.38%	1,892	31.08%	421	6.92%	160	2.63%	1,723	28.30%	6,088	23.36%
Long Beach	Los Angeles	64,625	53.47%	43,210	35.75%	10,071	8.33%	2,949	2.44%	21,415	17.72%	120,855	13.58%
Los Angeles	Los Angeles	374,604	41.98%	424,363	47.55%	68,571	7.68%	24,885	2.79%	-49,759	-5.58%	892,423	8.98%
Lynwood	Los Angeles	2,454	30.72%	5,137	64.30%	279	3.49%	119	1.49%	-2,683	-33.58%	7,989	-3.17%
Manhattan Beach	Los Angeles	8,816	56.39%	4,413	28.23%	1,753	11.21%	651	4.16%	4,403	28.16%	15,633	1.61%
Maywood	Los Angeles	991	47.03%	982	46.61%	99	4.70%	35	1.66%	9	0.43%	2,107	20.30%
Monrovia	Los Angeles	5,958	60.07%	3,025	30.50%	684	6.90%	251	2.53%	2,933	29.57%	9,918	13.73%
Montebello	Los Angeles	5,809	41.53%	7,136	51.02%	814	5.82%	229	1.64%	-1,327	-9.49%	13,988	10.23%
Monterey Park	Los Angeles	7,282	46.03%	7,104	44.90%	1,104	6.98%	331	2.09%	178	1.13%	15,821	7.79%
Norwalk	Los Angeles	11,058	50.63%	8,999	41.20%	1,338	6.13%	447	2.05%	2,059	9.43%	21,842	28.61%
Palmdale	Los Angeles	3,010	69.87%	980	22.75%	217	5.04%	101	2.34%	2,030	47.12%	4,308	24.60%
Palos Verdes Estates	Los Angeles	5,565	73.57%	1,211	16.01%	648	8.57%	140	1.85%	4,354	57.56%	7,564	0.76%
Paramount	Los Angeles	3,124	49.19%	2,719	42.81%	379	5.97%	129	2.03%	405	6.38%	6,351	30.31%
Pasadena	Los Angeles	20,786	49.34%	16,479	39.12%	3,620	8.59%	1,239	2.94%	4,307	10.22%	42,124	-1.57%
Pico Rivera	Los Angeles	4,645	35.23%	7,600	57.65%	699	5.30%	239	1.81%	-2,955	-22.42%	13,183	13.21%
Pomona	Los Angeles	10,917	48.83%	9,359	41.86%	1,519	6.79%	562	2.51%	1,558	6.97%	22,357	16.07%
Rancho Palos Verdes	Los Angeles	12,536	70.69%	3,319	18.72%	1,504	8.48%	375	2.11%	9,217	51.97%	17,734	4.83%
Redondo Beach	Los Angeles	12,223	57.02%	6,357	29.65%	2,067	9.64%	791	3.69%	5,866	27.36%	21,438	15.44%
Rolling Hills	Los Angeles	866	82.63%	113	10.78%	46	4.39%	23	2.19%	753	71.85%	1,048	1.30%
Rolling Hills Estates	Los Angeles	3,196	76.88%	591	14.22%	292	7.02%	78	1.88%	2,605	62.67%	4,157	9.32%
Rosemead	Los Angeles	4,339	47.83%	4,018	44.29%	497	5.48%	218	2.40%	321	3.54%	9,072	16.74%
San Dimas	Los Angeles	5,986	66.07%	2,295	25.33%	604	6.67%	175	1.93%	3,691	40.74%	9,060	25.20%
San Fernando	Los Angeles	1,878	47.19%	1,799	45.20%	212	5.33%	91	2.29%	79	1.98%	3,980	9.33%
San Gabriel	Los Angeles	5,922	58.11%	3,468	34.03%	614	6.02%	187	1.83%	2,454	24.08%	10,191	8.63%
San Marino	Los Angeles	5,830	81.20%	792	11.03%	434	6.04%	124	1.73%	5,038	70.17%	7,180	-2.87%
Santa Fe Springs	Los Angeles	1,755	42.36%	2,076	50.11%	237	5.72%	75	1.81%	-321	-7.75%	4,143	21.52%
Santa Monica	Los Angeles	16,757	43.12%	16,476	42.40%	3,924	10.10%	1,702	4.38%	281	0.72%	38,859	1.88%
Sierra Madre	Los Angeles	3,372	62.48%	1,309	24.25%	553	10.25%	163	3.02%	2,063	38.22%	5,397	6.70%
Signal Hill	Los Angeles	901	51.49%	610	34.86%	164	9.37%	75	4.29%	291	16.63%	1,750	24.22%
South El Monte	Los Angeles	985	38.63%	1,364	53.49%	150	5.88%	51	2.00%	-379	-14.86%	2,550	16.81%
South Gate	Los Angeles	7,207	54.50%	5,152	38.96%	636	4.81%	230	1.74%	2,055	15.54%	13,225	20.59%
South Pasadena	Los Angeles	5,860	59.18%	2,809	28.37%	952	9.61%	281	2.84%	3,051	30.81%	9,902	-2.28%
Temple City	Los Angeles	8,030	66.42%	3,071	25.40%	745	6.16%	243	2.01%	4,959	41.02%	12,089	16.04%
Torrance	Los Angeles	34,258	64.28%	14,040	26.34%	3,787	7.11%	1,214	2.28%	20,218	37.93%	53,299	13.66%
Walnut	Los Angeles	2,647	66.46%	985	24.73%	283	7.11%	68	1.71%	1,662	41.73%	3,983	22.18%
West Covina	Los Angeles	17,075	62.19%	7,937	28.91%	1,876	6.83%	567	2.07%	9,138	33.28%	27,455	20.22%
Whittier	Los Angeles	18,528	66.22%	7,017	25.08%	1,903	6.80%	531	1.90%	11,511	41.14%	27,979	12.11%
Unincorporated Area	Los Angeles	151,832	50.94%	120,807	40.53%	18,898	6.34%	6,506	2.18%	31,025	10.41%	298,043	10.00%
Unapportioned Absentees	Los Angeles	74,331	57.99%	40,294	31.44%	10,295	8.03%	3,258	2.54%	34,037	26.55%	128,178	8.99%
Chowchilla	Madera	696	49.40%	632	44.85%	60	4.26%	21	1.49%	64	4.54%	1,409	22.69%
Madera	Madera	2,526	44.08%	2,849	49.72%	271	4.73%	84	1.47%	-323	-5.64%	5,730	8.40%
Unincorporated Area	Madera	6,454	57.74%	3,849	34.43%	611	5.47%	264	2.36%	2,605	23.30%	11,178	23.12%
Unapportioned Absentees	Madera	923	63.09%	453	30.96%	71	4.85%	16	1.09%	470	32.13%	1,463	17.00%
Belvedere	Marin	835	63.64%	290	22.10%	151	11.51%	36	2.74%	545	41.54%	1,312	-4.76%
Corte Madera	Marin	1,692	43.73%	1,500	38.77%	480	12.41%	197	5.09%	192	4.96%	3,869	-1.81%
Fairfax	Marin	917	26.56%	1,711	49.57%	464	13.44%	360	10.43%	-794	-23.00%	3,452	1.00%
Larkspur	Marin	2,862	50.02%	1,842	32.19%	731	12.78%	287	5.02%	1,020	17.83%	5,722	-4.37%
Mill Valley	Marin	2,154	34.78%	2,723	43.97%	867	14.00%	449	7.25%	-569	-9.19%	6,193	-5.19%
Novato	Marin	9,177	54.71%	5,116	30.50%	1,940	11.56%	542	3.23%	4,061	24.21%	16,775	8.16%
Ross	Marin	710	54.07%	355	27.04%	182	13.86%	66	5.03%	355	27.04%	1,313	-10.47%
San Anselmo	Marin	2,000	33.80%	2,667	45.07%	811	13.71%	439	7.42%	-667	-11.27%	5,917	-4.05%
San Rafael	Marin	9,313	47.14%	7,117	36.02%	2,448	12.39%	879	4.45%	2,196	11.12%	19,757	-3.28%
Sausalito	Marin	1,367	39.53%	1,369	39.59%	534	15.44%	188	5.44%	-2	-0.06%	3,458	-3.46%
Tiburon	Marin	1,602	52.75%	868	28.58%	470	15.48%	97	3.19%	734	24.17%	3,037	-3.80%
Unincorporated Area	Marin	11,831	42.57%	10,695	38.48%	3,410	12.27%	1,858	6.68%	1,136	4.09%	27,794	-0.41%
Unapportioned Absentees	Marin	5,218	52.66%	2,978	30.06%	1,317	13.29%	395	3.99%	2,240	22.61%	9,908	-2.14%
Unincorporated Area	Mariposa	3,082	54.96%	1,889	33.68%	458	8.17%	179	3.19%	1,193	21.27%	5,608	23.17%
Fort Bragg	Mendocino	793	42.36%	790	42.20%	188	10.04%	101	5.40%	3	0.16%	1,872	5.06%
Point Arena	Mendocino	91	57.96%	43	27.39%	8	5.10%	15	9.55%	48	30.57%	157	18.15%
Ukiah	Mendocino	2,205	44.46%	2,016	40.65%	480	9.68%	259	5.22%	189	3.81%	4,960	-2.53%
Willits	Mendocino	611	48.49%	488	38.73%	77	6.11%	84	6.67%	123	9.76%	1,260	19.65%
Unincorporated Area	Mendocino	7,698	43.17%	6,699	37.57%	1,766	9.90%	1,667	9.35%	999	5.60%	17,830	13.38%
Unapportioned Absentees	Mendocino	1,034	48.21%	748	34.87%	228	10.63%	135	6.29%	286	13.33%	2,145	7.99%
Atwater	Merced	2,057	51.17%	1,572	39.10%	306	7.61%	85	2.11%	485	12.06%	4,020	13.88%
Dos Palos	Merced	477	51.57%	395	42.70%	34	3.68%	19	2.05%	82	8.86%	925	6.97%
Gustine	Merced	416	34.93%	652	54.74%	94	7.89%	29	2.43%	-236	-19.82%	1,191	11.83%
Livingston	Merced	186	33.33%	320	57.35%	46	8.24%	6	1.08%	-134	-24.01%	558	0.90%
Los Banos	Merced	1,357	43.07%	1,557	49.41%	190	6.03%	47	1.49%	-200	-6.35%	3,151	13.60%
Merced	Merced	4,591	46.10%	4,495	45.14%	668	6.71%	205	2.06%	96	0.96%	9,959	3.57%
Unincorporated Area	Merced	7,414	51.44%	5,883	40.81%	793	5.50%	324	2.25%	1,531	10.62%	14,414	15.75%
Unapportioned Absentees	Merced	1,545	55.62%	1,012	36.43%	185	6.66%	36	1.30%	533	19.19%	2,778	5.08%
Alturas	Modoc	693	56.85%	405	33.22%	94	7.71%	27	2.21%	288	23.63%	1,219	37.97%
Unincorporated Area	Modoc	1,670	68.47%	552	22.63%	172	7.05%	45	1.85%	1,118	45.84%	2,439	29.89%
Unapportioned Absentees	Modoc	216	63.16%	89	26.02%	27	7.89%	10	2.92%	127	37.13%	342	30.49%
Unincorporated Area	Mono	2,132	62.32%	865	25.29%	302	8.83%	122	3.57%	1,267	37.04%	3,421	15.64%
Carmel-by-the-Sea	Monterey	1,383	53.29%	781	30.10%	341	13.14%	90	3.47%	602	23.20%	2,595	5.57%
Del Rey Oaks	Monterey	436	58.29%	206	27.54%	88	11.76%	18	2.41%	230	30.75%	748	21.45%
Gonzales	Monterey	226	39.37%	295	51.39%	42	7.32%	11	1.92%	-69	-12.02%	574	-9.29%
Greenfield	Monterey	312	48.30%	290	44.89%	34	5.26%	10	1.55%	22	3.41%	646	5.17%
King City	Monterey	772	67.31%	291	25.37%	70	6.10%	14	1.22%	481	41.94%	1,147	7.62%
Marina	Monterey	1,774	53.81%	1,211	36.73%	248	7.52%	64	1.94%	563	17.08%	3,297	28.94%
Monterey	Monterey	4,446	51.01%	2,938	33.71%	1,084	12.44%	248	2.85%	1,508	17.30%	8,716	16.88%
Pacific Grove	Monterey	3,226	45.80%	2,645	37.56%	912	12.95%	260	3.69%	581	8.25%	7,043	11.19%
Salinas	Monterey	11,493	54.43%	7,536	35.69%	1,608	7.62%	478	2.26%	3,957	18.74%	21,115	15.27%
Sand City	Monterey	23	43.40%	27	50.94%	1	1.89%	2	3.77%	-4	-7.55%	53	12.15%
Seaside	Monterey	2,171	36.69%	3,217	54.37%	411	6.95%	118	1.99%	-1,046	-17.68%	5,917	18.69%
Soledad	Monterey	279	31.92%	541	61.90%	33	3.78%	21	2.40%	-262	-29.98%	874	-5.38%
Unincorporated Area	Monterey	16,140	60.92%	7,101	26.80%	2,493	9.41%	761	2.87%	9,039	34.12%	26,495	16.80%
Unapportioned Absentees	Monterey	4,771	62.99%	2,007	26.50%	643	8.49%	153	2.02%	2,764	36.49%	7,574	14.60%
Calistoga	Napa	920	52.54%	624	35.64%	171	9.77%	36	2.06%	296	16.90%	1,751	6.33%
Napa	Napa	10,756	51.25%	7,525	35.85%	2,114	10.07%	593	2.83%	3,231	15.39%	20,988	16.01%
St. Helena	Napa	1,287	61.14%	579	27.51%	179	8.50%	60	2.85%	708	33.63%	2,105	0.84%
Yountville	Napa	500	39.97%	594	47.48%	123	9.83%	34	2.72%	-94	-7.51%	1,251	4.67%
Unincorporated Area	Napa	8,058	56.49%	4,433	31.08%	1,292	9.06%	482	3.38%	3,625	25.41%	14,265	11.56%
Unapportioned Absentees	Napa	2,111	57.44%	1,143	31.10%	339	9.22%	82	2.23%	968	26.34%	3,675	8.50%
Grass Valley	Nevada	1,257	53.13%	818	34.57%	197	8.33%	94	3.97%	439	18.55%	2,366	17.01%
Nevada City	Nevada	616	46.07%	481	35.98%	157	11.74%	83	6.21%	135	10.10%	1,337	11.90%
Unincorporated Area	Nevada	13,334	59.11%	6,306	27.95%	1,881	8.34%	1,037	4.60%	7,028	31.16%	22,558	29.41%
Anaheim	Orange	51,960	68.08%	17,816	23.34%	4,870	6.38%	1,676	2.20%	34,144	44.74%	76,322	26.31%
Brea	Orange	9,088	71.03%	2,660	20.79%	810	6.33%	236	1.84%	6,428	50.24%	12,794	18.24%
Buena Park	Orange	13,940	63.34%	6,170	28.04%	1,363	6.19%	534	2.43%	7,770	35.31%	22,007	26.42%
Costa Mesa	Orange	20,028	63.38%	7,796	24.67%	2,661	8.42%	1,114	3.53%	12,232	38.71%	31,599	12.07%
Cypress	Orange	10,637	66.13%	3,979	24.74%	1,157	7.19%	313	1.95%	6,658	41.39%	16,086	18.13%
Fountain Valley	Orange	15,928	70.77%	4,537	20.16%	1,537	6.83%	505	2.24%	11,391	50.61%	22,507	16.63%
Fullerton	Orange	28,735	67.10%	9,628	22.48%	3,475	8.11%	985	2.30%	19,107	44.62%	42,823	17.52%
Garden Grove	Orange	28,772	65.62%	11,144	25.42%	2,871	6.55%	1,058	2.41%	17,628	40.21%	43,845	26.06%
Huntington Beach	Orange	46,206	66.22%	15,967	22.88%	5,613	8.04%	1,989	2.85%	30,239	43.34%	69,775	16.60%
Irvine	Orange	18,472	67.30%	5,751	20.95%	2,468	8.99%	757	2.76%	12,721	46.35%	27,448	12.83%
La Habra	Orange	11,399	66.41%	4,357	25.38%	1,101	6.41%	308	1.79%	7,042	41.03%	17,165	18.07%
La Palma	Orange	3,937	67.94%	1,393	24.04%	372	6.42%	93	1.60%	2,544	43.90%	5,795	16.51%
Laguna Beach	Orange	4,658	51.52%	2,849	31.51%	1,108	12.26%	426	4.71%	1,809	20.01%	9,041	3.42%
Los Alamitos	Orange	2,637	61.38%	1,246	29.00%	319	7.43%	94	2.19%	1,391	32.38%	4,296	16.19%
Newport Beach	Orange	23,884	74.10%	5,151	15.98%	2,363	7.33%	832	2.58%	18,733	58.12%	32,230	6.65%
Orange	Orange	25,518	71.04%	7,341	20.44%	2,295	6.39%	767	2.14%	18,177	50.60%	35,921	20.15%
Placentia	Orange	9,853	69.17%	3,142	22.06%	973	6.83%	277	1.94%	6,711	47.11%	14,245	18.08%
San Clemente	Orange	8,570	71.20%	2,313	19.22%	854	7.10%	299	2.48%	6,257	51.99%	12,036	11.16%
San Juan Capistrano	Orange	5,888	71.91%	1,564	19.10%	555	6.78%	181	2.21%	4,324	52.81%	8,188	17.43%
Santa Ana	Orange	28,950	59.89%	14,992	31.01%	3,104	6.42%	1,294	2.68%	13,958	28.87%	48,340	18.80%
Seal Beach	Orange	9,330	62.73%	4,287	28.82%	960	6.45%	297	2.00%	5,043	33.90%	14,874	3.96%
Stanton	Orange	4,525	61.74%	2,151	29.35%	452	6.17%	201	2.74%	2,374	32.39%	7,329	27.90%
Tustin	Orange	7,894	70.16%	2,273	20.20%	784	6.97%	300	2.67%	5,621	49.96%	11,251	15.88%
Villa Park	Orange	2,773	83.32%	331	9.95%	176	5.29%	48	1.44%	2,442	73.38%	3,328	11.51%
Westminster	Orange	17,553	65.52%	6,805	25.40%	1,836	6.85%	596	2.22%	10,748	40.12%	26,790	24.90%
Yorba Linda	Orange	9,020	74.23%	2,073	17.06%	809	6.66%	250	2.06%	6,947	57.17%	12,152	18.30%
Unincorporated Area	Orange	81,897	71.93%	21,822	19.17%	7,824	6.87%	2,309	2.03%	60,075	52.77%	113,852	14.15%
Unapportioned Absentees	Orange	27,745	72.68%	7,166	18.77%	2,589	6.78%	673	1.76%	20,579	53.91%	38,173	15.30%
Auburn	Placer	1,739	52.22%	1,167	35.05%	301	9.04%	123	3.69%	572	17.18%	3,330	13.56%
Colfax	Placer	168	44.44%	173	45.77%	25	6.61%	12	3.17%	-5	-1.32%	378	11.21%
Lincoln	Placer	579	44.20%	605	46.18%	91	6.95%	35	2.67%	-26	-1.98%	1,310	25.95%
Rocklin	Placer	1,665	57.51%	960	33.16%	207	7.15%	63	2.18%	705	24.35%	2,895	34.70%
Roseville	Placer	4,655	48.79%	3,913	41.01%	756	7.92%	217	2.27%	742	7.78%	9,541	29.38%
Unincorporated Area	Placer	17,260	56.73%	9,403	30.91%	2,694	8.85%	1,067	3.51%	7,857	25.83%	30,424	29.03%
Unapportioned Absentees	Placer	2,113	59.32%	1,090	30.60%	282	7.92%	77	2.16%	1,023	28.72%	3,562	26.13%
Portola	Plumas	307	41.21%	344	46.17%	66	8.86%	28	3.76%	-37	-4.97%	745	25.29%
Unincorporated Area	Plumas	3,413	51.92%	2,268	34.50%	659	10.03%	233	3.54%	1,145	17.42%	6,573	24.13%
Unapportioned Absentees	Plumas	462	54.80%	299	35.47%	58	6.88%	24	2.85%	163	19.34%	843	22.02%
Banning	Riverside	2,450	53.31%	1,819	39.58%	246	5.35%	81	1.76%	631	13.73%	4,596	29.57%
Beaumont	Riverside	1,283	55.64%	839	36.38%	138	5.98%	46	1.99%	444	19.25%	2,306	30.18%
Blythe	Riverside	1,031	57.02%	706	39.05%	49	2.71%	22	1.22%	325	17.98%	1,808	20.21%
Coachella	Riverside	269	20.90%	941	73.12%	59	4.58%	18	1.40%	-672	-52.21%	1,287	-3.48%
Corona	Riverside	6,935	60.67%	3,482	30.46%	764	6.68%	250	2.19%	3,453	30.21%	11,431	28.26%
Desert Hot Springs	Riverside	1,277	54.67%	861	36.86%	151	6.46%	47	2.01%	416	17.81%	2,336	30.04%
Hemet	Riverside	7,517	65.50%	3,371	29.37%	473	4.12%	116	1.01%	4,146	36.12%	11,477	26.96%
Indian Wells	Riverside	707	78.47%	138	15.32%	44	4.88%	12	1.33%	569	63.15%	901	-8.28%
Indio	Riverside	2,200	52.00%	1,753	41.43%	223	5.27%	55	1.30%	447	10.56%	4,231	19.59%
Lake Elsinore	Riverside	1,001	49.38%	877	43.27%	113	5.57%	36	1.78%	124	6.12%	2,027	31.28%
Norco	Riverside	3,912	67.69%	1,373	23.76%	342	5.92%	152	2.63%	2,539	43.93%	5,779	41.17%
Palm Desert	Riverside	3,633	72.38%	991	19.74%	311	6.20%	84	1.67%	2,642	52.64%	5,019	15.12%
Palm Springs	Riverside	7,820	59.81%	4,089	31.28%	963	7.37%	202	1.55%	3,731	28.54%	13,074	16.11%
Perris	Riverside	1,055	50.50%	928	44.42%	77	3.69%	29	1.39%	127	6.08%	2,089	45.26%
Rancho Mirage	Riverside	2,167	71.99%	631	20.96%	188	6.25%	24	0.80%	1,536	51.03%	3,010	13.91%
Riverside	Riverside	32,720	55.19%	19,883	33.54%	5,286	8.92%	1,397	2.36%	12,837	21.65%	59,286	22.49%
San Jacinto	Riverside	1,123	53.71%	819	39.17%	123	5.88%	26	1.24%	304	14.54%	2,091	32.89%
Unincorporated Area	Riverside	57,394	61.54%	28,552	30.61%	5,567	5.97%	1,757	1.88%	28,842	30.92%	93,270	33.66%
Unapportioned Absentees	Riverside	9,785	64.13%	4,142	27.15%	1,093	7.16%	238	1.56%	5,643	36.98%	15,258	20.03%
Folsom	Sacramento	2,605	53.94%	1,379	28.56%	360	7.45%	485	10.04%	1,226	25.39%	4,829	29.73%
Galt	Sacramento	829	53.80%	567	36.79%	102	6.62%	43	2.79%	262	17.00%	1,541	23.84%
Isleton	Sacramento	119	38.14%	167	53.53%	14	4.49%	12	3.85%	-48	-15.38%	312	14.28%
Sacramento	Sacramento	42,391	38.17%	55,904	50.34%	9,988	8.99%	2,769	2.49%	-13,513	-12.17%	111,052	4.41%
Unincorporated Area	Sacramento	107,740	52.73%	71,991	35.23%	19,185	9.39%	5,403	2.64%	35,749	17.50%	204,319	19.74%
Unapportioned Absentees	Sacramento	37	55.22%	23	34.33%	6	8.96%	1	1.49%	14	20.90%	67	N/A
Hollister	San Benito	1,399	45.94%	1,337	43.91%	217	7.13%	92	3.02%	62	2.04%	3,045	5.78%
San Juan Bautista	San Benito	174	35.73%	240	49.28%	43	8.83%	30	6.16%	-66	-13.55%	487	12.68%
Unincorporated Area	San Benito	1,964	59.75%	981	29.84%	235	7.15%	107	3.26%	983	29.91%	3,287	17.73%
Unapportioned Absentees	San Benito	517	66.03%	191	24.39%	57	7.28%	18	2.30%	326	41.63%	783	7.32%
Adelanto	San Bernardino	333	60.11%	179	32.31%	34	6.14%	8	1.44%	154	27.80%	554	41.25%
Barstow	San Bernardino	2,553	49.03%	2,171	41.69%	370	7.11%	113	2.17%	382	7.34%	5,207	17.35%
Chino	San Bernardino	6,321	64.36%	2,718	27.67%	591	6.02%	192	1.95%	3,603	36.68%	9,822	25.95%
Colton	San Bernardino	2,231	37.08%	3,268	54.32%	412	6.85%	105	1.75%	-1,037	-17.24%	6,016	20.75%
Fontana	San Bernardino	4,708	50.75%	3,563	38.41%	788	8.50%	217	2.34%	1,145	12.34%	9,276	37.05%
Grand Terrace	San Bernardino	1,887	62.82%	787	26.20%	269	8.95%	61	2.03%	1,100	36.62%	3,004	N/A
Loma Linda	San Bernardino	2,167	69.61%	592	19.02%	288	9.25%	66	2.12%	1,575	50.59%	3,113	-19.97%
Montclair	San Bernardino	3,776	59.72%	1,943	30.73%	439	6.94%	165	2.61%	1,833	28.99%	6,323	32.76%
Needles	San Bernardino	602	52.35%	467	40.61%	57	4.96%	24	2.09%	135	11.74%	1,150	14.62%
Ontario	San Bernardino	13,783	59.24%	7,388	31.75%	1,556	6.69%	541	2.33%	6,395	27.48%	23,268	30.29%
Rancho Cucamonga	San Bernardino	11,782	66.56%	4,347	24.56%	1,209	6.83%	363	2.05%	7,435	42.00%	17,701	N/A
Redlands	San Bernardino	10,271	62.29%	4,659	28.26%	1,286	7.80%	273	1.66%	5,612	34.03%	16,489	8.95%
Rialto	San Bernardino	5,681	52.08%	4,306	39.48%	695	6.37%	226	2.07%	1,375	12.61%	10,908	25.24%
San Bernardino	San Bernardino	16,473	47.08%	15,600	44.58%	2,289	6.54%	631	1.80%	873	2.49%	34,993	18.29%
Upland	San Bernardino	12,172	67.15%	4,397	24.26%	1,276	7.04%	282	1.56%	7,775	42.89%	18,127	19.48%
Victorville	San Bernardino	2,717	62.65%	1,319	30.41%	213	4.91%	88	2.03%	1,398	32.23%	4,337	29.08%
Unincorporated Area	San Bernardino	63,455	62.89%	29,137	28.88%	6,045	5.99%	2,267	2.25%	34,318	34.01%	100,904	30.84%
Unapportioned Absentees	San Bernardino	12,045	64.69%	4,949	26.58%	1,289	6.92%	337	1.81%	7,096	38.11%	18,620	20.26%
Carlsbad	San Diego	11,085	69.22%	3,281	20.49%	1,271	7.94%	378	2.36%	7,804	48.73%	16,015	17.66%
Chula Vista	San Diego	18,545	62.04%	8,297	27.76%	2,515	8.41%	536	1.79%	10,248	34.28%	29,893	24.14%
Coronado	San Diego	5,799	71.47%	1,468	18.09%	675	8.32%	172	2.12%	4,331	53.38%	8,114	10.94%
Del Mar	San Diego	1,300	45.11%	1,031	35.77%	421	14.61%	130	4.51%	269	9.33%	2,882	9.15%
El Cajon	San Diego	17,967	64.01%	7,244	25.81%	2,265	8.07%	594	2.12%	10,723	38.20%	28,070	26.01%
Escondido	San Diego	16,428	70.23%	4,916	21.02%	1,522	6.51%	526	2.25%	11,512	49.21%	23,392	24.92%
Imperial Beach	San Diego	3,278	58.70%	1,602	28.69%	553	9.90%	151	2.70%	1,676	30.01%	5,584	31.44%
La Mesa	San Diego	15,559	60.61%	6,890	26.84%	2,634	10.26%	587	2.29%	8,669	33.77%	25,670	16.29%
Lemon Grove	San Diego	4,885	57.93%	2,600	30.83%	720	8.54%	228	2.70%	2,285	27.10%	8,433	N/A
National City	San Diego	5,254	51.60%	3,951	38.80%	781	7.67%	197	1.93%	1,303	12.80%	10,183	28.72%
Oceanside	San Diego	17,855	67.43%	6,367	24.04%	1,740	6.57%	519	1.96%	11,488	43.38%	26,481	25.94%
San Diego	San Diego	186,491	54.96%	106,282	31.32%	37,391	11.02%	9,178	2.70%	80,209	23.64%	339,342	14.74%
San Marcos	San Diego	6,005	71.45%	1,657	19.71%	558	6.64%	185	2.20%	4,348	51.73%	8,405	28.52%
Vista	San Diego	9,518	69.98%	2,901	21.33%	845	6.21%	337	2.48%	6,617	48.65%	13,601	24.80%
Unincorporated Area	San Diego	115,941	67.88%	36,923	21.62%	13,600	7.96%	4,337	2.54%	79,018	46.26%	170,801	26.02%
San Francisco	San Francisco	80,967	31.87%	133,184	52.43%	29,365	11.56%	10,512	4.14%	-52,217	-20.56%	254,028	-8.62%
Escalon	San Joaquin	601	55.29%	381	35.05%	82	7.54%	23	2.12%	220	20.24%	1,087	19.59%
Lodi	San Joaquin	8,925	67.33%	3,156	23.81%	936	7.06%	238	1.80%	5,769	43.52%	13,255	21.99%
Manteca	San Joaquin	3,948	51.75%	2,973	38.97%	553	7.25%	155	2.03%	975	12.78%	7,629	29.05%
Ripon	San Joaquin	970	70.19%	330	23.88%	70	5.07%	12	0.87%	640	46.31%	1,382	14.79%
Stockton	San Joaquin	22,151	49.26%	18,330	40.76%	3,622	8.05%	866	1.93%	3,821	8.50%	44,969	13.86%
Tracy	San Joaquin	2,883	50.15%	2,295	39.92%	456	7.93%	115	2.00%	588	10.23%	5,749	19.37%
Unincorporated Area	San Joaquin	21,169	58.35%	12,207	33.65%	2,249	6.20%	653	1.80%	8,962	24.70%	36,278	20.80%
Unapportioned Absentees	San Joaquin	4,071	62.50%	1,879	28.85%	448	6.88%	116	1.78%	2,192	33.65%	6,514	19.05%
Arroyo Grande	San Luis Obispo	3,302	63.39%	1,407	27.01%	410	7.87%	90	1.73%	1,895	36.38%	5,209	30.32%
Atascadero	San Luis Obispo	4,295	59.36%	2,009	27.76%	729	10.07%	203	2.81%	2,286	31.59%	7,236	N/A
El Paso de Robles	San Luis Obispo	2,531	65.83%	932	24.24%	306	7.96%	76	1.98%	1,599	41.59%	3,845	16.60%
Grover City	San Luis Obispo	1,428	49.17%	1,122	38.64%	272	9.37%	82	2.82%	306	10.54%	2,904	33.19%
Morro Bay	San Luis Obispo	2,468	53.34%	1,471	31.79%	549	11.87%	139	3.00%	997	21.55%	4,627	20.17%
Pismo Beach	San Luis Obispo	1,520	53.81%	937	33.17%	285	10.09%	83	2.94%	583	20.64%	2,825	18.75%
San Luis Obispo	San Luis Obispo	8,238	46.39%	5,761	32.44%	3,185	17.93%	576	3.24%	2,477	13.95%	17,760	8.90%
Unincorporated Area	San Luis Obispo	14,849	59.11%	6,869	27.34%	2,671	10.63%	732	2.91%	7,980	31.77%	25,121	24.60%
Atherton	San Mateo	2,709	69.84%	603	15.55%	489	12.61%	78	2.01%	2,106	54.29%	3,879	-3.35%
Belmont	San Mateo	5,496	51.86%	3,387	31.96%	1,411	13.32%	303	2.86%	2,109	19.90%	10,597	7.63%
Brisbane	San Mateo	406	38.27%	484	45.62%	131	12.35%	40	3.77%	-78	-7.35%	1,061	15.25%
Burlingame	San Mateo	6,452	53.77%	3,699	30.83%	1,544	12.87%	305	2.54%	2,753	22.94%	12,000	1.69%
Colma	San Mateo	58	45.31%	52	40.63%	11	8.59%	7	5.47%	6	4.69%	128	35.72%
Daly City	San Mateo	8,212	40.48%	9,889	48.75%	1,733	8.54%	451	2.22%	-1,677	-8.27%	20,285	4.30%
Foster City	San Mateo	5,360	57.14%	2,699	28.77%	1,131	12.06%	191	2.04%	2,661	28.37%	9,381	5.56%
Half Moon Bay	San Mateo	1,345	48.36%	960	34.52%	363	13.05%	113	4.06%	385	13.84%	2,781	12.83%
Hillsborough	San Mateo	3,781	75.62%	662	13.24%	491	9.82%	66	1.32%	3,119	62.38%	5,000	-0.97%
Menlo Park	San Mateo	5,754	46.05%	4,525	36.21%	1,829	14.64%	388	3.10%	1,229	9.84%	12,496	-2.64%
Millbrae	San Mateo	4,868	55.53%	2,843	32.43%	887	10.12%	168	1.92%	2,025	23.10%	8,766	7.43%
Pacifica	San Mateo	5,124	40.53%	5,561	43.98%	1,471	11.63%	488	3.86%	-437	-3.46%	12,644	11.20%
Portola Valley	San Mateo	1,353	59.42%	515	22.62%	342	15.02%	67	2.94%	838	36.80%	2,277	0.20%
Redwood City	San Mateo	9,569	46.55%	7,692	37.42%	2,599	12.64%	697	3.39%	1,877	9.13%	20,557	9.07%
San Bruno	San Mateo	5,775	45.39%	5,258	41.33%	1,363	10.71%	327	2.57%	517	4.06%	12,723	10.77%
San Carlos	San Mateo	6,690	55.21%	3,657	30.18%	1,435	11.84%	336	2.77%	3,033	25.03%	12,118	5.97%
San Mateo	San Mateo	15,859	50.45%	11,171	35.54%	3,639	11.58%	767	2.44%	4,688	14.91%	31,436	4.21%
South San Francisco	San Mateo	6,299	41.29%	7,124	46.69%	1,430	9.37%	404	2.65%	-825	-5.41%	15,257	8.82%
Woodside	San Mateo	1,668	62.47%	576	21.57%	346	12.96%	80	3.00%	1,092	40.90%	2,670	4.74%
Unincorporated Area	San Mateo	9,599	38.69%	10,804	43.55%	3,333	13.44%	1,072	4.32%	-1,205	-4.86%	24,808	5.88%
Unapportioned Absentees	San Mateo	10,114	56.91%	5,174	29.11%	2,007	11.29%	478	2.69%	4,940	27.79%	17,773	0.42%
Carpinteria	Santa Barbara	1,919	51.60%	1,300	34.96%	386	10.38%	114	3.07%	619	16.64%	3,719	17.29%
Guadalupe	Santa Barbara	248	40.66%	318	52.13%	36	5.90%	8	1.31%	-70	-11.48%	610	12.82%
Lompoc	Santa Barbara	5,143	60.62%	2,563	30.21%	586	6.91%	192	2.26%	2,580	30.41%	8,484	33.70%
Santa Barbara	Santa Barbara	14,211	43.43%	12,820	39.18%	4,320	13.20%	1,370	4.19%	1,391	4.25%	32,721	8.50%
Santa Maria	Santa Barbara	7,785	63.97%	3,531	29.02%	665	5.46%	188	1.54%	4,254	34.96%	12,169	26.45%
Unincorporated Area	Santa Barbara	34,726	55.71%	17,792	28.54%	7,973	12.79%	1,844	2.96%	16,934	27.17%	62,335	17.92%
Unapportioned Absentees	Santa Barbara	5,597	62.49%	2,326	25.97%	820	9.15%	214	2.39%	3,271	36.52%	8,957	15.39%
Campbell	Santa Clara	4,740	47.50%	3,520	35.28%	1,373	13.76%	345	3.46%	1,220	12.23%	9,978	14.88%
Cupertino	Santa Clara	8,327	53.83%	4,242	27.42%	2,421	15.65%	479	3.10%	4,085	26.41%	15,469	2.89%
Gilroy	Santa Clara	2,942	48.35%	2,347	38.57%	636	10.45%	160	2.63%	595	9.78%	6,085	11.74%
Los Altos	Santa Clara	8,360	58.63%	3,248	22.78%	2,281	16.00%	370	2.59%	5,112	35.85%	14,259	-0.49%
Los Altos Hills	Santa Clara	2,487	63.59%	760	19.43%	572	14.63%	92	2.35%	1,727	44.16%	3,911	9.16%
Los Gatos	Santa Clara	7,015	53.84%	3,703	28.42%	1,884	14.46%	427	3.28%	3,312	25.42%	13,029	6.14%
Milpitas	Santa Clara	4,533	45.68%	3,870	39.00%	1,198	12.07%	322	3.24%	663	6.68%	9,923	28.09%
Monte Sereno	Santa Clara	1,179	60.55%	444	22.80%	274	14.07%	50	2.57%	735	37.75%	1,947	7.35%
Morgan Hill	Santa Clara	3,533	57.75%	1,733	28.33%	704	11.51%	148	2.42%	1,800	29.42%	6,118	24.57%
Mountain View	Santa Clara	10,054	43.55%	8,477	36.72%	3,686	15.97%	868	3.76%	1,577	6.83%	23,085	3.45%
Palo Alto	Santa Clara	9,977	35.13%	11,094	39.06%	5,945	20.93%	1,383	4.87%	-1,117	-3.93%	28,399	-2.46%
San Jose	Santa Clara	90,072	47.27%	70,955	37.24%	23,761	12.47%	5,762	3.02%	19,117	10.03%	190,550	13.48%
Santa Clara	Santa Clara	13,445	43.60%	12,326	39.98%	4,074	13.21%	989	3.21%	1,119	3.63%	30,834	10.79%
Saratoga	Santa Clara	10,061	63.98%	3,263	20.75%	1,974	12.55%	427	2.72%	6,798	43.23%	15,725	3.40%
Sunnyvale	Santa Clara	20,236	49.40%	13,637	33.29%	5,776	14.10%	1,312	3.20%	6,599	16.11%	40,961	8.83%
Unincorporated Area	Santa Clara	18,319	43.90%	16,035	38.42%	5,910	14.16%	1,469	3.52%	2,284	5.47%	41,733	10.83%
Unapportioned Absentees	Santa Clara	13,768	55.08%	7,341	29.37%	3,012	12.05%	876	3.50%	6,427	25.71%	24,997	5.05%
Capitola	Santa Cruz	1,713	42.25%	1,666	41.10%	484	11.94%	191	4.71%	47	1.16%	4,054	10.99%
Santa Cruz	Santa Cruz	6,673	32.86%	9,021	44.43%	2,567	12.64%	2,045	10.07%	-2,348	-11.56%	20,306	9.82%
Scotts Valley	Santa Cruz	2,202	62.19%	874	24.68%	354	10.00%	111	3.13%	1,328	37.50%	3,541	19.66%
Watsonville	Santa Cruz	2,638	45.90%	2,244	39.05%	764	13.29%	101	1.76%	394	6.86%	5,747	13.27%
Unincorporated Area	Santa Cruz	20,910	45.19%	16,691	36.07%	5,814	12.56%	2,861	6.18%	4,219	9.12%	46,276	14.58%
Unapportioned Absentees	Santa Cruz	3,211	54.61%	1,850	31.46%	607	10.32%	212	3.61%	1,361	23.15%	5,880	15.11%
Anderson	Shasta	1,248	51.96%	951	39.59%	142	5.91%	61	2.54%	297	12.36%	2,402	26.59%
Redding	Shasta	9,769	57.05%	5,597	32.68%	1,340	7.82%	419	2.45%	4,172	24.36%	17,125	23.89%
Unincorporated Area	Shasta	16,530	59.27%	8,816	31.61%	1,738	6.23%	807	2.89%	7,714	27.66%	27,891	34.71%
Loyalton	Sierra	213	44.94%	218	45.99%	34	7.17%	9	1.90%	-5	-1.05%	474	19.95%
Unincorporated Area	Sierra	535	51.84%	353	34.21%	102	9.88%	42	4.07%	182	17.64%	1,032	27.10%
Unapportioned Absentees	Sierra	107	50.47%	80	37.74%	20	9.43%	5	2.36%	27	12.74%	212	5.81%
Dorris	Siskiyou	159	56.58%	103	36.65%	12	4.27%	7	2.49%	56	19.93%	281	29.14%
Dunsmuir	Siskiyou	306	41.02%	343	45.98%	70	9.38%	27	3.62%	-37	-4.96%	746	24.17%
Etna	Siskiyou	194	61.59%	94	29.84%	17	5.40%	10	3.17%	100	31.75%	315	7.60%
Fort Jones	Siskiyou	150	60.73%	74	29.96%	18	7.29%	5	2.02%	76	30.77%	247	14.53%
Montague	Siskiyou	190	55.23%	122	35.47%	22	6.40%	10	2.91%	68	19.77%	344	23.51%
Mt. Shasta	Siskiyou	549	50.65%	415	38.28%	83	7.66%	37	3.41%	134	12.36%	1,084	17.67%
Tulelake	Siskiyou	213	70.30%	76	25.08%	12	3.96%	2	0.66%	137	45.21%	303	24.27%
Weed	Siskiyou	328	33.47%	579	59.08%	57	5.82%	16	1.63%	-251	-25.61%	980	5.59%
Yreka	Siskiyou	1,450	58.30%	741	29.79%	241	9.69%	55	2.21%	709	28.51%	2,487	12.00%
Unincorporated Area	Siskiyou	4,893	58.13%	2,650	31.48%	611	7.26%	264	3.14%	2,243	26.65%	8,418	24.74%
Unapportioned Absentees	Siskiyou	899	58.64%	467	30.46%	126	8.22%	41	2.67%	432	28.18%	1,533	24.66%
Benicia	Solano	3,043	47.04%	2,473	38.23%	686	10.60%	267	4.13%	570	8.81%	6,469	20.73%
Dixon	Solano	1,422	56.14%	822	32.45%	210	8.29%	79	3.12%	600	23.69%	2,533	18.90%
Fairfield	Solano	8,360	54.90%	5,295	34.77%	1,245	8.18%	329	2.16%	3,065	20.13%	15,229	28.60%
Rio Vista	Solano	687	54.01%	473	37.19%	90	7.08%	22	1.73%	214	16.82%	1,272	14.82%
Suisun City	Solano	1,434	51.58%	961	34.57%	265	9.53%	120	4.32%	473	17.01%	2,780	47.30%
Vacaville	Solano	7,976	58.11%	4,160	30.31%	1,298	9.46%	291	2.12%	3,816	27.80%	13,725	29.68%
Vallejo	Solano	11,595	41.31%	13,666	48.69%	2,101	7.49%	706	2.52%	-2,071	-7.38%	28,068	17.74%
Unincorporated Area	Solano	3,629	60.56%	1,753	29.26%	433	7.23%	177	2.95%	1,876	31.31%	5,992	31.80%
Unapportioned Absentees	Solano	2,773	60.18%	1,349	29.28%	385	8.36%	101	2.19%	1,424	30.90%	4,608	24.78%
Cloverdale	Sonoma	747	50.58%	544	36.83%	147	9.95%	39	2.64%	203	13.74%	1,477	22.71%
Cotati	Sonoma	376	29.89%	605	48.09%	154	12.24%	123	9.78%	-229	-18.20%	1,258	18.79%
Healdsburg	Sonoma	1,579	51.84%	1,036	34.01%	317	10.41%	114	3.74%	543	17.83%	3,046	7.76%
Petaluma	Sonoma	6,337	48.59%	4,812	36.90%	1,420	10.89%	473	3.63%	1,525	11.69%	13,042	10.34%
Rohnert Park	Sonoma	3,972	48.15%	2,977	36.09%	962	11.66%	338	4.10%	995	12.06%	8,249	21.58%
Santa Rosa	Sonoma	19,196	51.57%	12,574	33.78%	4,171	11.20%	1,284	3.45%	6,622	17.79%	37,225	9.32%
Sebastopol	Sonoma	1,092	45.94%	886	37.27%	274	11.53%	125	5.26%	206	8.67%	2,377	15.24%
Sonoma	Sonoma	1,659	50.76%	1,130	34.58%	373	11.41%	106	3.24%	529	16.19%	3,268	0.35%
Unincorporated Area	Sonoma	25,764	45.97%	21,032	37.53%	6,250	11.15%	2,997	5.35%	4,732	8.44%	56,043	14.85%
Ceres	Stanislaus	1,454	45.57%	1,441	45.16%	242	7.58%	54	1.69%	13	0.41%	3,191	24.07%
Hughson	Stanislaus	150	48.54%	128	41.42%	21	6.80%	10	3.24%	22	7.12%	309	26.12%
Modesto	Stanislaus	12,068	47.71%	10,008	39.57%	2,643	10.45%	575	2.27%	2,060	8.14%	25,294	15.25%
Newman	Stanislaus	286	37.24%	403	52.47%	59	7.68%	20	2.60%	-117	-15.23%	768	8.74%
Oakdale	Stanislaus	1,367	48.53%	1,202	42.67%	203	7.21%	45	1.60%	165	5.86%	2,817	15.98%
Patterson	Stanislaus	447	45.20%	468	47.32%	65	6.57%	9	0.91%	-21	-2.12%	989	4.53%
Riverbank	Stanislaus	213	31.56%	408	60.44%	45	6.67%	9	1.33%	-195	-28.89%	675	14.66%
Turlock	Stanislaus	3,968	54.86%	2,557	35.35%	546	7.55%	162	2.24%	1,411	19.51%	7,233	10.09%
Waterford	Stanislaus	379	49.74%	330	43.31%	40	5.25%	13	1.71%	49	6.43%	762	31.43%
Unincorporated Area	Stanislaus	18,714	50.09%	14,972	40.07%	2,875	7.70%	799	2.14%	3,742	10.02%	37,360	19.20%
Unapportioned Absentees	Stanislaus	2,549	53.24%	1,766	36.88%	395	8.25%	78	1.63%	783	16.35%	4,788	8.62%
Live Oak	Sutter	444	52.92%	325	38.74%	34	4.05%	36	4.29%	119	14.18%	839	39.35%
Yuba City	Sutter	4,316	61.73%	1,993	28.50%	432	6.18%	251	3.59%	2,323	33.22%	6,992	27.61%
Unincorporated Area	Sutter	5,901	64.33%	2,459	26.81%	535	5.83%	278	3.03%	3,442	37.52%	9,173	22.33%
Unapportioned Absentees	Sutter	1,117	71.93%	326	20.99%	88	5.67%	22	1.42%	791	50.93%	1,553	24.44%
Corning	Tehama	867	55.33%	581	37.08%	81	5.17%	38	2.43%	286	18.25%	1,567	21.58%
Red Bluff	Tehama	1,691	53.72%	1,091	34.66%	266	8.45%	100	3.18%	600	19.06%	3,148	29.93%
Tehama	Tehama	128	59.53%	73	33.95%	8	3.72%	6	2.79%	55	25.58%	215	52.77%
Unincorporated Area	Tehama	5,715	61.23%	2,751	29.48%	571	6.12%	296	3.17%	2,964	31.76%	9,333	38.18%
Unapportioned Absentees	Tehama	739	61.89%	336	28.14%	88	7.37%	31	2.60%	403	33.75%	1,194	27.28%
Unincorporated Area	Trinity	3,048	54.96%	1,734	31.27%	506	9.12%	258	4.65%	1,314	23.69%	5,546	27.94%
Dinuba	Tulare	1,365	53.53%	1,075	42.16%	75	2.94%	35	1.37%	290	11.37%	2,550	4.14%
Exeter	Tulare	985	57.47%	615	35.88%	96	5.60%	18	1.05%	370	21.59%	1,714	13.53%
Farmersville	Tulare	378	39.46%	527	55.01%	42	4.38%	11	1.15%	-149	-15.55%	958	30.62%
Lindsay	Tulare	897	55.51%	645	39.91%	54	3.34%	20	1.24%	252	15.59%	1,616	6.74%
Porterville	Tulare	2,988	55.03%	2,067	38.07%	282	5.19%	93	1.71%	921	16.96%	5,430	0.77%
Tulare	Tulare	2,803	46.86%	2,868	47.94%	234	3.91%	77	1.29%	-65	-1.09%	5,982	14.69%
Visalia	Tulare	11,551	63.25%	5,421	29.68%	1,008	5.52%	282	1.54%	6,130	33.57%	18,262	11.64%
Woodlake	Tulare	359	51.29%	308	44.00%	19	2.71%	14	2.00%	51	7.29%	700	25.07%
Unincorporated Area	Tulare	16,234	58.27%	10,031	36.00%	1,110	3.98%	486	1.74%	6,203	22.26%	27,861	11.21%
Unapportioned Absentees	Tulare	3,757	65.08%	1,598	27.68%	324	5.61%	94	1.63%	2,159	37.40%	5,773	10.53%
Sonora	Tuolumne	772	51.19%	561	37.20%	131	8.69%	44	2.92%	211	13.99%	1,508	11.06%
Unincorporated Area	Tuolumne	7,069	54.80%	4,352	33.74%	1,139	8.83%	339	2.63%	2,717	21.06%	12,899	26.56%
Unapportioned Absentees	Tuolumne	969	58.51%	536	32.37%	120	7.25%	31	1.87%	433	26.15%	1,656	12.44%
Camarillo	Ventura	11,454	64.54%	4,665	26.29%	1,306	7.36%	322	1.81%	6,789	38.25%	17,747	14.97%
Fillmore	Ventura	1,539	55.90%	1,038	37.70%	133	4.83%	43	1.56%	501	18.20%	2,753	21.97%
Ojai	Ventura	1,599	52.03%	1,104	35.93%	295	9.60%	75	2.44%	495	16.11%	3,073	13.18%
Oxnard	Ventura	14,041	51.92%	10,356	38.30%	2,090	7.73%	555	2.05%	3,685	13.63%	27,042	23.53%
Port Hueneme	Ventura	2,714	58.18%	1,460	31.30%	393	8.42%	98	2.10%	1,254	26.88%	4,665	25.30%
Ventura	Ventura	18,706	56.02%	10,767	32.25%	3,053	9.14%	865	2.59%	7,939	23.78%	33,391	19.67%
Santa Paula	Ventura	3,152	50.24%	2,691	42.89%	317	5.05%	114	1.82%	461	7.35%	6,274	13.50%
Simi Valley	Ventura	18,173	68.27%	5,923	22.25%	1,808	6.79%	716	2.69%	12,250	46.02%	26,620	33.16%
Thousand Oaks	Ventura	22,777	67.68%	7,504	22.30%	2,603	7.73%	770	2.29%	15,273	45.38%	33,654	18.00%
Unincorporated Area	Ventura	20,759	58.63%	10,794	30.49%	2,888	8.16%	964	2.72%	9,965	28.15%	35,405	20.13%
Davis	Yolo	5,923	28.57%	9,673	46.65%	4,083	19.69%	1,055	5.09%	-3,750	-18.09%	20,734	-3.18%
Winters	Yolo	434	45.97%	411	43.54%	67	7.10%	32	3.39%	23	2.44%	944	22.86%
Woodland	Yolo	6,029	53.20%	4,103	36.20%	935	8.25%	266	2.35%	1,926	16.99%	11,333	14.46%
Unincorporated Area	Yolo	7,217	43.27%	7,340	44.01%	1,584	9.50%	538	3.23%	-123	-0.74%	16,679	16.58%
Marysville	Yuba	2,140	58.79%	1,194	32.80%	231	6.35%	75	2.06%	946	25.99%	3,640	19.14%
Wheatland	Yuba	279	53.24%	193	36.83%	31	5.92%	21	4.01%	86	16.41%	524	19.73%
Unincorporated Area	Yuba	4,920	55.08%	3,210	35.93%	533	5.97%	270	3.02%	1,710	19.14%	8,933	36.03%
Unapportioned Absentees	Yuba	603	59.47%	299	29.49%	83	8.19%	29	2.86%	304	29.98%	1,014	14.21%
Totals (Note: Vote totals differ due to discrepancies between vote totals in California’s Statement of Vote compared to the results cited elsewhere in this article from US Election Atlas, and because California's Supplement to Statement of Vote does not count write in votes as part of the city totals.)		4,523,479	52.70%	3,083,197	35.92%	739,680	8.62%	237,437	2.77%	1,440,282	16.78%	8,583,793	14.99%

==== City that flipped from Republican to Democratic ====
- Sausalito (Marin)

==== Cities & Unincorporated Areas that flipped from Democratic to Republican ====
- Fremont (Alameda)
- Newark (Alameda)
- San Leandro (Alameda)
- Unincorporated Area (Alameda)
- Ione (Amador)
- Plymouth (Amador)
- Unincorporated Area (Amador)
- Biggs (Butte)
- Angels (Calaveras)
- Williams (Colusa)
- Antioch (Contra Costa)
- Concord (Contra Costa)
- Martinez (Contra Costa)
- Pinole (Contra Costa)
- Crescent City (Del Norte)
- Unincorporated Area (Del Norte)
- Placerville (El Dorado)
- South Lake Tahoe (El Dorado)
- Unincorporated Area (El Dorado)
- Clovis (Fresno)
- Coalinga (Fresno)
- Fresno (Fresno)
- Kerman (Fresno)
- Selma (Fresno)
- Unincorporated Area (Glenn)
- Blue Lake (Humboldt)
- Eureka (Humboldt)
- Rio Dell (Humboldt)
- Unincorporated Area (Humboldt)
- Calipatria (Imperial)
- Imperial (Imperial)
- California City (Kern)
- Maricopa (Kern)
- Wasco (Kern)
- Corcoran (Kings)
- Unincorporated Area (Kings)
- Unincorporated Area (Lake)
- Susanville (Lassen)
- Unincorporated Area (Lassen)
- Artesia (Los Angeles)
- Azusa (Los Angeles)
- Baldwin Park (Los Angeles)
- Bell (Los Angeles)
- Bellflower (Los Angeles)
- Beverly Hills (Los Angeles)
- Cudahy (Los Angeles)
- Culver City (Los Angeles)
- El Monte (Los Angeles)
- Huntington Park (Los Angeles)
- Lawndale (Los Angeles)
- Maywood (Los Angeles)
- Monterey Park (Los Angeles)
- Norwalk (Los Angeles)
- Paramount (Los Angeles)
- Pomona (Los Angeles)
- Rosemead (Los Angeles)
- San Fernando (Los Angeles)
- Santa Monica (Los Angeles)
- Signal Hill (Los Angeles)
- South Gate (Los Angeles)
- Chowchilla (Madera)
- Unincorporated Area (Mariposa)
- Fort Bragg (Mendocino)
- Willits (Mendocino)
- Unincorporated Area (Mendocino)
- Atwater (Merced)
- Merced (Merced)
- Unincorporated Area (Merced)
- Alturas (Modoc)
- Greenfield (Monterey)
- Marina (Monterey)
- Pacific Grove (Monterey)
- Napa (Napa)
- Nevada City (Nevada)
- Rocklin (Placer)
- Roseville (Placer)
- Unincorporated Area (Placer)
- Unincorporated Area (Plumas)
- Banning (Riverside)
- Beaumont (Riverside)
- Blythe (Riverside)
- Desert Hot Springs (Riverside)
- Indio (Riverside)
- Lake Elsinore (Riverside)
- Perris (Riverside)
- Riverside (Riverside)
- San Jacinto (Riverside)
- Unincorporated Area (Riverside)
- Folsom (Sacramento)
- Galt (Sacramento)
- Unincorporated Area (Sacramento)
- Hollister (San Benito)
- Adelanto (San Bernardino)
- Barstow (San Bernardino)
- Fontana (San Bernardino)
- Montclair (San Bernardino)
- Needles (San Bernardino)
- Ontario (San Bernardino)
- Rialto (San Bernardino)
- San Bernardino (San Bernardino)
- Imperial Beach (San Diego)
- National City (San Diego)
- Manteca (San Joaquin)
- Stockton (San Joaquin)
- Tracy (San Joaquin)
- Grover City (San Luis Obispo)
- Colma (San Mateo)
- San Bruno (San Mateo)
- Carpinteria (Santa Barbara)
- Lompoc (Santa Barbara)
- Santa Barbara (Santa Barbara)
- Campbell (Santa Clara)
- Gilroy (Santa Clara)
- Milpitas (Santa Clara)
- San Jose (Santa Clara)
- Santa Clara (Santa Clara)
- Unincorporated Area (Santa Clara)
- Capitola (Santa Cruz)
- Watsonville (Santa Cruz)
- Unincorporated Area (Santa Cruz)
- Anderson (Shasta)
- Unincorporated Area (Shasta)
- Unincorporated Area (Sierra)
- Dorris (Siskiyou)
- Montague (Siskiyou)
- Mt. Shasta (Siskiyou)
- Benicia (Solano)
- Fairfield (Solano)
- Suisun City (Solano)
- Vacaville (Solano)
- Unincorporated Area (Solano)
- Cloverdale (Sonoma)
- Rohnert Park (Sonoma)
- Sebastopol (Sonoma)
- Unincorporated Area (Sonoma)
- Ceres (Stanislaus)
- Hughson (Stanislaus)
- Modesto (Stanislaus)
- Oakdale (Stanislaus)
- Waterford (Stanislaus)
- Unincorporated Area (Stanislaus)
- Live Oak (Sutter)
- Corning (Tehama)
- Red Bluff (Tehama)
- Tehama (Tehama)
- Unincorporated Area (Tehama)
- Unincorporated Area (Trinity)
- Woodlake (Tulare)
- Unincorporated Area (Tuolumne)
- Fillmore (Ventura)
- Oxnard (Ventura)
- Santa Paula (Ventura)
- Winters (Yolo)
- Wheatland (Yuba)
- Unincorporated Area (Yuba)

=== Results by congressional district ===
District	Reagan	Carter	Representative
1st	59.0%	32.7%	Harold T. Johnson (96th Congress)
1st	59.0%	32.7%	Eugene A. Chappie (97th Congress)
2nd	51.7%	37.4%	Donald H. Clausen
3rd	49.2%	41.1%	Bob Matsui
4th	49.2%	41.1%	Vic Fazio
5th	40.6%	45.9%	John L. Burton
6th	34.2%	54.8%	Phillip Burton
7th	50.2%	40.2%	George Miller
8th	33.5%	54.8%	Ron Dellums
9th	46.0%	44.9%	Pete Stark
10th	46.5%	42.5%	Don Edwards
11th	50.4%	38.0%	William Royer (96th Congress)
11th	50.4%	38.0%	Tom Lantos (97th Congress)
12th	47.5%	36.1%	Pete McCloskey
13th	54.2%	32.7%	Norman Mineta
14th	57.0%	35.0%	Norman D. Shumway
15th	48.5%	44.4%	Tony Coelho
16th	52.6%	35.7%	Leon Panetta
17th	57.2%	36.7%	Chip Pashayan
18th	63.9%	31.0%	Bill Thomas
19th	55.6%	33.9%	Bob Lagomarsino
20th	65.5%	26.3%	Barry Goldwater Jr.
21st	52.6%	39.2%	James C. Corman (96th Congress)
21st	52.6%	39.2%	Bobbi Fiedler (97th Congress)
22nd	62.4%	30.2%	Carlos Moorhead
23rd	47.4%	42.0%	Anthony Beilenson
24th	42.8%	48.4%	Henry Waxman
25th	36.0%	57.5%	Edward R. Roybal
26th	65.3%	28.0%	John H. Rousselot
27th	59.1%	31.2%	Bob Dornan
28th	24.8%	69.9%	Julian Dixon
29th	17.5%	80.3%	Augustus Hawkins
30th	44.8%	49.1%	George E. Danielson
31st	35.1%	60.3%	Charles H. Wilson (96th Congress)
31st	35.1%	60.3%	Mervyn Dymally (97th Congress)
32nd	49.3%	44.1%	Glenn M. Anderson
33rd	64.0%	29.6%	Wayne R. Grisham
34th	62.4%	29.7%	Dan Lungren
35th	63.2%	29.5%	James F. Lloyd (96th Congress)
35th	63.2%	29.5%	David Dreier (97th Congress)
36th	54.0%	38.3%	George Brown Jr.
37th	64.0%	29.7%	Jerry Lewis
38th	64.8%	28.5%	Jerry M. Patterson
39th	71.4%	21.8%	William E. Dannemeyer
40th	70.8%	21.4%	Robert Badham
41st	59.0%	29.2%	Bob Wilson (96th Congress)
41st	59.0%	29.2%	Bill Lowery (97th Congress)
42nd	53.9%	37.5%	Lionel Van Deerlin (96th Congress)
42nd	53.9%	37.5%	Duncan L. Hunter (97th Congress)
43rd	67.6%	24.2%	Clair Burgener
