= Charity Sunshine Tillemann-Dick =

American operatic soprano and presenter (1983–2019)

- Born: Charity Sunshine Tillemann-Dick; July 22, 1983; Denver, Colorado, U.S.
- Died: April 23, 2019 (aged 35); Baltimore, Maryland, U.S.
- Education: Regis University (BA); Johns Hopkins University (MM)
- Occupations: Opera singer; presenter
- Years active: 1993–2019
- Spouse: Yonatan Doron (m. 2012)

Charity Sunshine Tillemann-Dick was an American soprano and presenter. A recipient of two bilateral (double) lung transplants, she spoke and performed frequently at concerts, conferences and events around the United States.

== Early life ==
Tillemann-Dick was born in Denver, Colorado, the fifth of eleven children, including siblings diplomat and technologist Tomicah S. Tillemann, and author Levi Tillemann. She received a bachelor's degree with high honors from Regis University and studied music at the Peabody Institute at Johns Hopkins University and the Franz Liszt Academy of Music in Budapest, where she was also a Fulbright scholar.

== Music ==
A full lyric coloratura soprano, Tillemann-Dick performed across the United States, Europe, and Asia in venues as diverse as The Rose Theater at Lincoln Center in New York City; The Kennedy Center in Washington, DC; Severance Hall in Cleveland, Ohio; The National Symphony Hall in Budapest, Hungary; the American Embassy in Beijing, China; and the National Statuary Hall in the United States Capitol. She collaborated or performed with noted conductors and musicians including Bruno Rigacci, Joella Jones, Marvin Hamlisch, Bono, Zoltán Kocsis, Joan Dornemann, Éva Marton, and former Secretary of State Condoleezza Rice. Some of her opera roles included Titania in A Midsummer's Night Dream, Gilda in Rigoletto, and Violetta in La traviata.

Tillemann-Dick performed for numerous presidents, prime ministers, members of Congress and world dignitaries.

== Health and advocacy ==
After receiving a diagnosis of idiopathic pulmonary hypertension in 2004, Tillemann-Dick served as the national spokesperson for the Pulmonary Hypertension Association. In December 2005, she testified about pulmonary hypertension before the U.S. Congress' Committee on Energy and Commerce.

In September 2009, Tillemann-Dick underwent a double lung transplant at the Cleveland Clinic. Just eight months later, she performed before the doctors, nurses, and support staff at the Clinic.

Tillemann-Dick then became a vocal advocate for organ donation and transplantation research in the United States. After complications from rejection, she received a second double lung transplant in January 2012.

== Presenting ==
After receiving her transplant, Tillemann-Dick presented at numerous conferences and events, including the Chicago Ideas Week, TEDMED, TEDxMidAtlantic; and the 6th Annual National Conference on Organ Donation. She was a frequent presenter and performer for corporate events, nonprofits and associations, and civic organizations, and was featured on the CBS Morning Show, CNN with Dr. Sanjay Gupta, TED.com, The Washington Post and BBC Radio.

== Personal life ==
Tillemann-Dick was the maternal granddaughter of Annette (Tillemann) and Congressman Tom Lantos, the former Chairman of the U.S. House Committee on Foreign Affairs and the only Holocaust survivor ever elected to the U.S. Congress. Her paternal grandmother, Nancy Dick, was the first female Lieutenant Governor of Colorado. On April 10, 2008, Tillemann-Dick's father, Timber Dick, a successful inventor and businessman from Denver, died from injuries received in a car accident.

She was married to Yonatan Doron; they lived in Baltimore, Maryland.

Tillemann-Dick was a member of the Church of Jesus Christ of Latter-day Saints.

== Death ==
In August 2018, she announced that she had cancer. On April 23, 2019, Tillemann-Dick died at the age of 35, from cancer triggered by long-term immunosuppression from the transplants.

== Bibliography ==
- Tillemann-Dick, Charity (2017). The Encore: A Memoir in Three Acts. Simon & Schuster. ISBN 978-1501102318.
