= Tom Lantos =

American politician (1928–2008)

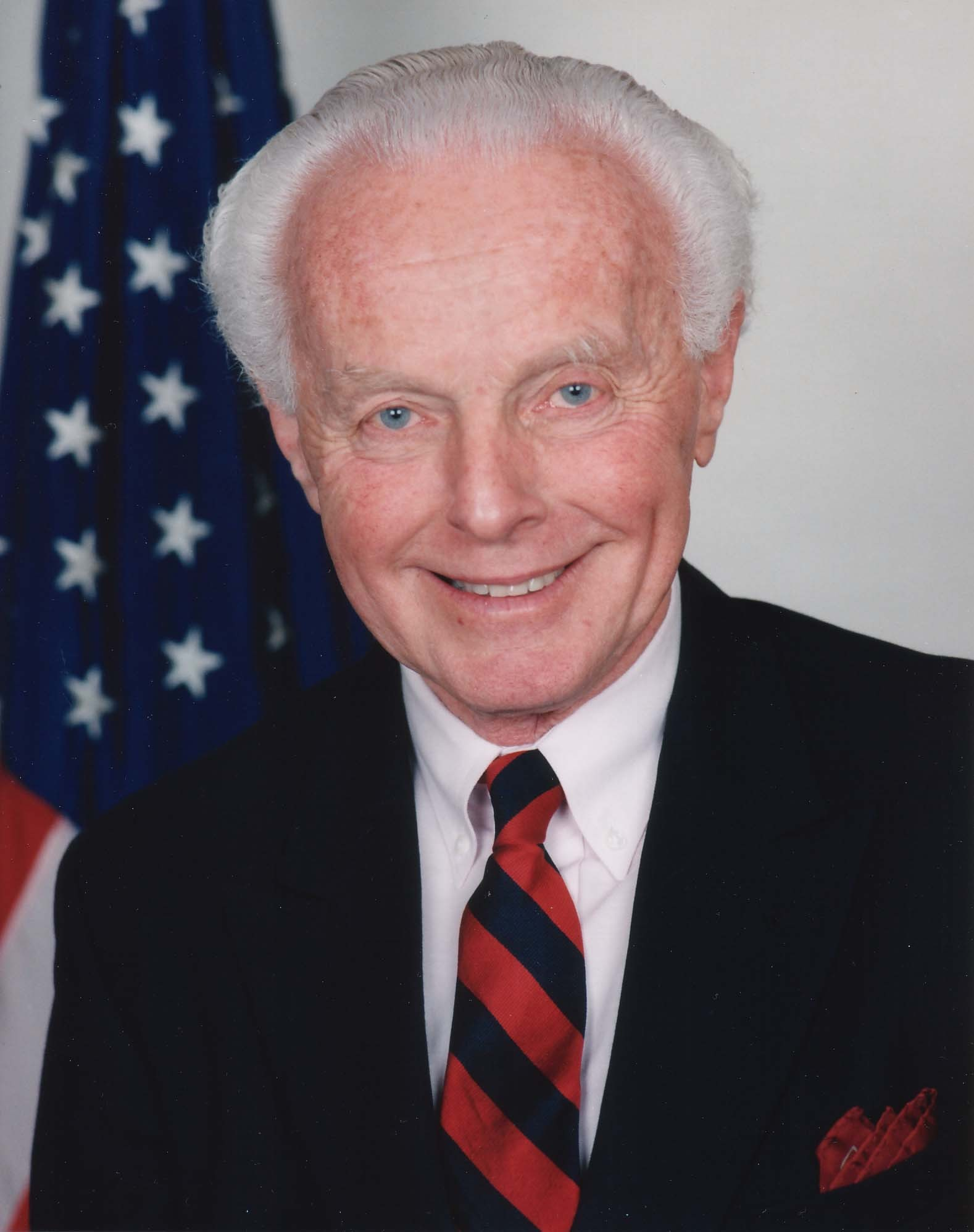

Chair of the House Foreign Affairs Committee
- In office January 3, 2007 – February 11, 2008
- Preceded by: Henry Hyde
- Succeeded by: Howard Berman

Member of the U.S. House of Representatives from California
- In office January 3, 1981 – February 11, 2008
- Preceded by: William Royer
- Succeeded by: Jackie Speier
- Constituency: 11th district (1981–1993); 12th district (1993–2008)

Personal details
- Born: Tamás Péter Lantos; February 1, 1928 Budapest, Kingdom of Hungary
- Died: February 11, 2008 (aged 80) Bethesda, Maryland, U.S.
- Party: Democratic
- Spouse: Annette Tillemann (m. 1950)
- Children: 2 daughters, including Katrina Swett
- Relatives: Tomicah S. Tillemann (grandson); Levi Tillemann (grandson); Charity Tillemann-Dick (granddaughter)
- Education: Eötvös Loránd University; University of Washington, Seattle (BA, MA); University of California, Berkeley (PhD)
- Tom Lantos's voice Lantos speaks on the 10th anniversary of Latvia's independence from the Soviet Union; Recorded July 17, 2000

Thomas Peter Lantos (born Tamás Péter Lantos; February 1, 1928 – February 11, 2008) was a Hungarian-born American politician who served as a U.S. representative from California from 1981 until his death in 2008. A member of the Democratic Party, he represented the state's 11th congressional district until 1993. After redistricting, he served from the 12th congressional district, which included both the northern two-thirds of San Mateo County and a portion of the southwestern part of San Francisco.

Lantos, who served as Chair of the House Foreign Affairs Committee in his last term, announced in early January 2008 that he would not run for re-election because of cancer of the esophagus. He died before finishing his term. A Hungarian Jew, Lantos was the only Holocaust survivor to have served in the United States Congress; he survived the genocide with help from Raoul Wallenberg. In speaking before the House of Representatives after his death, Speaker Nancy Pelosi stated that Lantos "devoted his public life to shining a bright light on the dark corners of oppression. He used his powerful voice to stir the consciousness of world leaders and the public alike."

In 2008, after his death, the Congressional Human Rights Caucus, which he founded in 1983, was renamed the Tom Lantos Human Rights Commission. Its mission is partly "to promote, defend, and advocate internationally recognized human rights". In the final weeks of his life, Lantos asked that a non-profit be established to carry on the work he felt so passionately about. The Lantos Foundation for Human Rights & Justice was founded later that year to carry out that wish. In 2011, the Tom Lantos Institute was set up in Budapest to promote tolerance and support minority issues in Central Europe and Eastern Europe, as well as around the world.

== Early life ==
Lantos was born Tamás Péter Lantos (Hungarian: [ˈtɒmaːʃ ˈpeːtɛr ˈlɒntoʃ]) into a Jewish family in Budapest, the son of Anna, a high school English teacher, and Pál Lantos, a banker. His family was heavily involved in education, and included an uncle who was a professor at the University of Budapest and a grandmother who was a high school principal.

=== World War II ===
His life in Hungary would change after the annexing of Austria by Nazi Germany in 1938, with the Austrian border just 100 miles (160 km) from Budapest. Lantos remembered this period and a newspaper headline he read when he was ten years old, "Hitler Marches into Austria". Even at a young age, he understood the significance of this invasion, recalling in a 1999 interview with University of Washington Magazine, "I sensed that this historic moment would have a tremendous impact on the lives of Hungarian Jews, my family, and myself".

Six years later, in March 1944, the German military invaded Hungary and occupied Budapest, its capital. As he was Jewish, Lantos, then 16, was arrested and sent to a forced labor camp outside of Budapest. He escaped, but was soon caught by the Germans and beaten severely, then returned to the labor camp. He again escaped, this time making his way back to Budapest, 40 miles (64 km) away. There, he hid with an aunt in a safe house set up by Raoul Wallenberg, a Swedish diplomat.

Lantos joined Wallenberg's network; his fair hair and blue eyes, which to the Nazis were physical signs of "Aryanism", enabled him to serve as a courier and deliver food and medicine to Jews living in other safe houses. In January 1945, less than a year later, Soviet military forces fought door-to-door battles and liberated Hungary from German occupation. However, Lantos, then 17, returned home only to discover that his mother and other family members had all been murdered by the Germans, along with 440,000 other Hungarian Jews, during the preceding 10 months of their occupation. Wallenberg, for his part, was later credited with saving the lives of thousands of other Hungarian Jews.

Lantos described some of his experiences in the Academy Award-winning documentary film The Last Days (1998), produced by Steven Spielberg's Shoah Foundation. In his floor speeches as a congressman, he sometimes referred to himself as one of the few living members of Congress who had fought against fascism. In 1981, Lantos sponsored a bill making Wallenberg an Honorary Citizen of the United States, and became a member of the International Raoul Wallenberg Foundation. In January 2006, he traveled to Hungary and attended a ceremony commemorating the 61st anniversary of the liberation of the Budapest Ghetto. The event was held at the Great Synagogue in Budapest.

=== Education ===
In 1946, Lantos enrolled at the University of Budapest. As a result of his fluent English, he wrote an essay about Franklin D. Roosevelt, and he was awarded a scholarship by the Hillel Foundation to study in the United States. He then emigrated to the U.S., and studied economics at the University of Washington in Seattle, where he earned a B.A. in 1949 and an M.A. in 1950. He continued his post-graduate education at the University of California, Berkeley, and received a Ph.D. in economics in 1953. His student years were thinly fictionalized in the character of Ted Lambros in Erich Segal's 1985 novel The Class.

=== Early career ===
After graduation from Berkeley, Lantos became a professor of economics at San Francisco State University. In subsequent years, he worked as a business consultant and television commentator on subjects of foreign policy. He eventually became a senior advisor to various U.S. Senators, and in 1980, he was elected to the U.S. Congress, where he remained until his death in February 2008. Recalling his early life, he announced his retirement by stating to Congress, "I will never be able to express fully my profoundly felt gratitude to this great country."

== Personal and family life ==
Despite becoming fluent in English, Lantos never lost his Hungarian accent. During his childhood, he met his future wife, Annette Tillemann (or Tilleman; born June 27, 1931), then using the name Agnes Ethel Seymour. Her family had managed to escape to Switzerland, using Swedish passports issued by Raoul Wallenberg. After Hungary was liberated, she and her family returned to Budapest, where she and Lantos met again. After emigrating to the United States, they married on July 13, 1950. They remained married until his death in 2008. Agnes Ethel Lantos became a naturalized United States citizen on May 17, 1954, under that name. Annette's father Sebastian was the brother of Jolie Gabor, with Jolie's daughters Magda, Zsa Zsa, and Eva Gabor being first cousins to Annette Lantos.

Lantos and his wife had two daughters, Annette Marie and Katrina, and 18 grandchildren, including Levi Tillemann, an author and energy expert; Tomicah S. Tillemann, a former Democratic political speechwriter; and Charity Tillemann-Dick, an opera singer and activist. The Lantoses' daughter Annette was married to Timber Dick, an independent businessman in Colorado, until his accidental death in 2008.

Lantos's younger daughter, Katrina Lantos Swett, is married to ambassador and former U.S. Representative from New Hampshire Richard Swett, and was herself a candidate for Congress in New Hampshire. She now serves as President of the Lantos Foundation for Human Rights and Justice, and she is also the co-chair of the International Religious Freedom Summit.

Lantos considered himself a secular Jew. He was an avid supporter of Israel.

== Political career and positions ==
Lantos made his first run for office in 1980, challenging Republican Congressman Bill Royer, who had won a 1979 special election after Democrat Leo Ryan was killed in the Jonestown massacre. Lantos defeated Royer by 5,700 votes. He never again faced such a close contest, and was re-elected 13 times. Lantos earned a reputation as a champion for various human rights causes, such as having Yahoo CEO Jerry Yang testify at a congressional hearing after the company turned over the email records of two Chinese dissidents to the Chinese government, allowing them to be traced and one sentenced to jail.

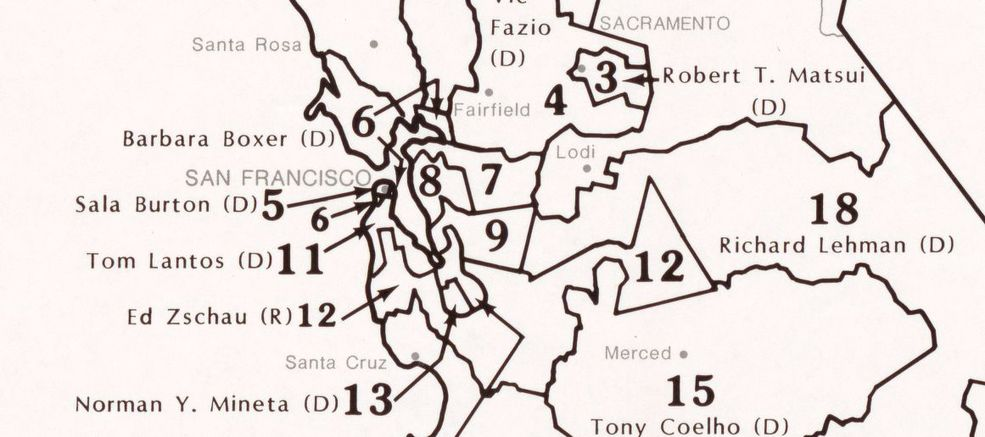
The 11th district that Lantos served from 1981 until 1993 included a small portion of San Francisco, as well as Daly City and San Mateo.

Lantos was a member of the Congressional Progressive Caucus, and repeatedly called for reforms to the nation's health-care system, reduction of the national budget deficit and the national debt, repeal of the Economic Growth and Tax Relief Reconciliation Act of 2001. He opposed Social Security privatization efforts. He supported same-sex marriage rights and marijuana for medical use, was a strong proponent of gun control and adamantly pro-choice.

Lantos was an advocate on behalf of the environment, receiving consistently high ratings from the League of Conservation Voters and other environmental organizations for his legislative record. His long-standing efforts to protect open space brought thousands of acres under the protection of the Golden Gate National Recreation Area, including Mori Point, Sweeney Ridge, and Rancho Corral de Tierra, which will keep its watersheds and delicate habitats free from development permanently.

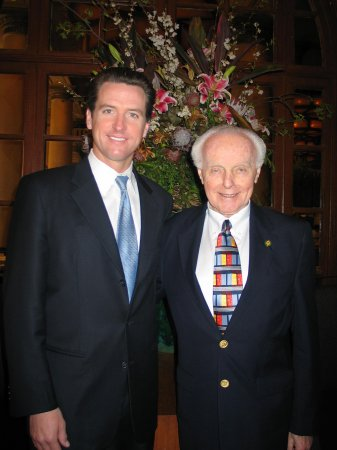
San Francisco Mayor Gavin Newsom and Lantos

While Lantos was an early supporter of the Iraq War, from 2006 onward, he acknowledged public criticism about the conduct of the war and called for a diplomatic approach toward ceasing hostilities.

== Foreign affairs issues ==
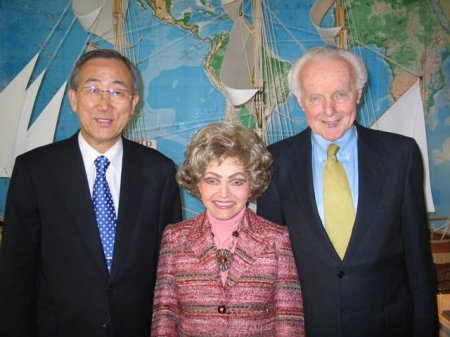
United Nations Secretary-General Ban Ki-moon with Tom and Annette Lantos

Lantos served as the chairman of the United States House Committee on Foreign Affairs. Through its more than 20 years of work, the Congressional Human Rights Caucus—of which Lantos was co-chair with Representative Frank Wolf—covered a wide range of human rights issues. They included speaking for Christians in Saudi Arabia and Sudan to practice their faith, helping Tibetans to retain their culture and religion in Tibet, and advocating for other minorities worldwide.

Among his other efforts was a demand that Japan apologize for sex slavery during World War II. He declared Turkey's mass killings of Armenians during World War I to be genocide. In more recent times, he supported democracy in Burma and pressed for sanctions on Iran for supporting terrorism. In 2004, he sponsored a bill to stop the spread of antisemitism.

On other aspects of American foreign policy, Lantos spoke out against waste, fraud and abuse in the multi-billion dollar U.S. reconstruction program in Iraq, and warned that the U.S. could lose Afghanistan to the Taliban if the Bush administration failed to take decisive action to halt the current decline in political stability there. Lantos was against U.S. military aid to Egypt as the Egyptian military had failed to stop the flow of money and weapons across the Egyptian border to Hamas in Gaza, and Egypt had not contributed troops to the peacekeeping efforts in Afghanistan and elsewhere.

=== 1991 Gulf War ===
Lantos was a strong supporter of the 1991 Persian Gulf War. During the run-up to the war in 1990, the Congressional Human Rights Caucus, of which Lantos was co-chairman, hosted a 15 year old Kuwaiti girl, then identified only as "Nurse Nayirah", who told of horrific abuses by Iraqi soldiers following the Iraqi invasion of Kuwait, including the killing of Kuwaiti babies by taking them out of their incubators and leaving them to die on the floor of the hospital. These alleged atrocities figured prominently in the rhetoric at the time about Iraqi abuses in Kuwait. Her witness account was later challenged by independent human rights monitors.

"Nurse Nayirah" later turned out to be the daughter of Saud Nasser Al-Saud Al-Sabah, a member of Kuwait's ruling Al-Sabah family who served as Kuwait's ambassador to the United States at the time. Asked about having allowed the girl to give testimony without identifying herself, and without her story having been corroborated, Lantos replied, "The notion that any of the witnesses brought to the caucus through the Kuwaiti Embassy would not be credible did not cross my mind... I have no basis for assuming that her story is not true, but the point goes beyond that. If one hypothesizes that the woman's story is fictitious from A to Z, that in no way diminishes the avalanche of human rights violations."

The Canadian Broadcasting Corporation sent investigators to Kuwait who went through the hospital and counted the incubators and they found that "except for one or two that may have been misplaced" all of the incubators were still in the hospital. The investigators concluded that there were no deaths resulting from stolen equipment. And the doctor who provided Amnesty International with the number of babies killed dropped from 312 to 72 and then 30, 19 of which died before the invasion of Kuwait by Iraq. After the war, The New York Times wrote, "It's plainly wrong for a member of congress to collaborate with a public relations firm to produce knowingly deceptive testimony on an important issue. Yet Representative Tom Lantos has been caught doing exactly that. His behavior warrants a searching inquiry by the House Ethics Committee."

=== War in Iraq ===
On October 4, 2002, Lantos led a narrow majority of Democrats on the House International Relations Committee to a successful vote in support of the Resolution for the Use of Force, seeking the approval of the United Nations and under the condition that President George W. Bush would allow UN weapons inspectors to finish their work and that Bush would need to return to Congress for an actual declaration of war before invading Iraq. The resolution later passed the House and the Senate with a total of 373 of 435 members of Congress supporting it. "The train is now on its way", said Lantos after the resolution successfully passed both houses of Congress. In later hearings on the war, Lantos continued his enthusiastic support.

Starting in early 2006, Lantos distanced himself from the Bush Administration's Iraq policy, making critical statements at hearings, on the House floor and in published media interviews about the conduct of the war. During hearings of the House International Relations Committee, where he was then the ranking member, Lantos repeatedly praised the investigative work of the office of the Special Inspector of Iraq Reconstruction General Stuart Bowen, which uncovered evidence of waste, fraud and abuse in the use of U.S. taxpayer dollars intended to help secure and rebuild Iraq. Lantos was an immediate and consistent critic of the troop surge advocated by President Bush. On the night in January 2007 that Bush announced his plan, Lantos responded, "I oppose the so-called surge that constitutes the centerpiece of the President's plan. Our efforts in Iraq are a mess, and throwing in more troops will not improve it."

During a joint House hearing on September 10, 2007, featuring General David Petraeus and Ambassador Ryan Crocker, Lantos said:

The Administration's myopic policies in Iraq have created a fiasco. Is it any wonder that on the subject of Iraq, more and more Americans have little confidence in this Administration? We can not take ANY of this Administration's assertions on Iraq at face value anymore, and no amount of charts or statistics will improve its credibility. This is not a knock on you, General Petraeus, or on you, Ambassador Crocker. But the fact remains, gentlemen, that the Administration has sent you here today to convince the members of these two Committees and the Congress that victory is at hand. With all due respect to you, I must say ... I don't buy it.

At the same hearing, Lantos drew comparisons between some of the current U.S. activities in Iraq to U.S. support two decades earlier of Islamic militants in Afghanistan:

America should not be in the business of arming, training and funding both sides of a religious civil war in Iraq. Did the Administration learn nothing from our country's actions in Afghanistan two decades ago, when by supporting Islamist militants against the Soviet Union, we helped pave the way for the rise of the Taliban? Why are we now repeating the short-sighted patterns of the past?

== Human rights advocacy ==
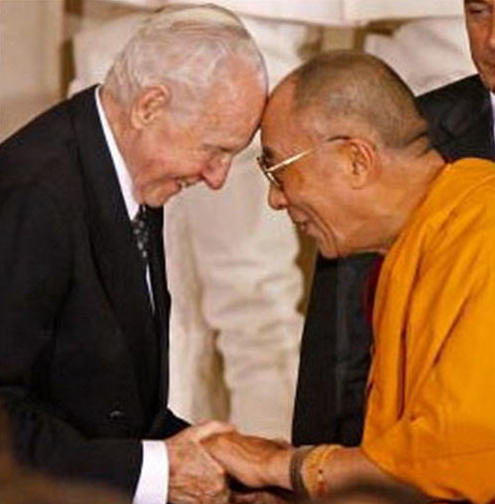
Presenting the Dalai Lama with the Congressional Gold Medal, 2007

=== Tibet ===
As co-founder of the Congressional Human Rights Caucus in 1983 and as Chairman of the Foreign Affairs Committee, Lantos would "stir the consciousness of world leaders and the public alike", according to Representative Nancy Pelosi. She added: "Wherever there was injustice or oppression, he used his expertise and moral authority to put the United States on the side of justice and human rights". In 2007, in his effort to help the people of China and Tibet, he presented the Dalai Lama with the Congressional Gold Medal.

=== Darfur ===
On April 28, 2006, Lantos and four other Democratic U.S. Representatives, along with six other activists, took part in a civil disobedience action in front of the Sudanese embassy in Washington, D.C. They were protesting the role of the Sudanese government in carrying out genocide in the Darfur conflict and were arrested for disorderly conduct.

=== Hungarian minorities ===
Lantos was an activist for the rights of Hungarian minorities; as a member of the US House of Representatives. In a 2007 letter he asked Robert Fico, the Prime Minister of Slovakia to distance themselves from the Beneš decrees, a reasonable process in the Hedvig Malina case, and to treat members of the Hungarian minority as equal.

The American Hungarian Federation recognized Congressman Lantos for his "Leadership in Support of Democracy, Human Rights and Minority Rights in Central and Eastern Europe", awarding him the organization's highest award, the "Col. Commandant Michael Kovats Medal of Freedom", at the October 19, 2005, Congressional Reception commemorating the 49th Anniversary of the 1956 Hungarian Revolution.

=== Lebanon ===
On August 27, 2006, at the Israeli Foreign Ministry building in Israel, Lantos said he would block a foreign aid package promised by President George W. Bush to Lebanon unless and until Beirut agreed to the deployment of international troops on the border with Syria and Lebanon takes control of its borders with Syria to prevent arms smuggling to Hezbollah guerrillas.

=== Morocco and Western Sahara ===
Lantos supported Morocco's demand to gain sovereignty over Western Sahara, and criticized the Polisario Front, which demands independence for the disputed region. In 2007, he backed Morocco's proposal to make the region autonomous under Moroccan rule, saying: "I urge the leadership of the Polisario to realize that they will never again get such a good deal for the population they purport to represent."

== Death and legacy ==
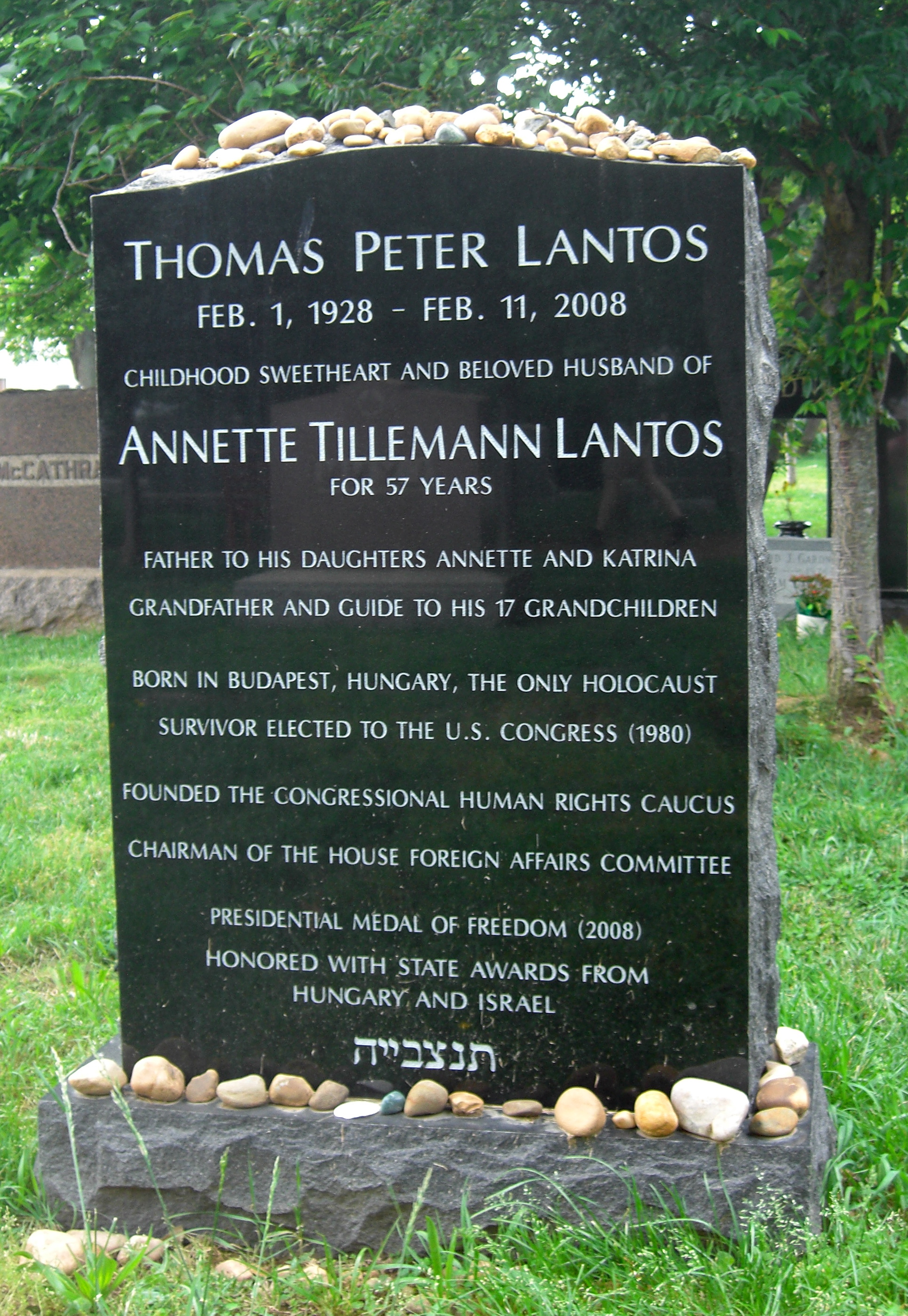
Lantos's grave in Congressional Cemetery, Washington, D.C. The letters at the bottom are a Hebrew acronym for May his soul be bound up in the bond of eternal life.

On January 2, 2008, after having been diagnosed with esophageal cancer, Lantos announced he would not run for a 15th term in the House, but planned to complete his final term. In his statement, he said:

It is only in the United States that a penniless survivor of the Holocaust and a fighter in the anti-Nazi underground could have received an education, raised a family, and had the privilege of serving the last three decades of his life as a Member of Congress. I will never be able to express fully my profoundly felt gratitude to this great country."

Lantos died from complications of esophageal cancer at Walter Reed National Military Medical Center on February 11, 2008, ten days after his 80th birthday, and eleven months before the end of his term. Numerous politicians memorialized him; House Minority Whip Roy Blunt called him "a man of uncommon integrity and sincere moral conviction — and a public servant who never wavered in his pursuit of a better, freer and more religiously tolerant world", and President George W. Bush called Lantos "a man of character and a champion of human rights" and "a living reminder that we must never turn a blind eye to the suffering of the innocent at the hands of evil men". A memorial service was held for Lantos on February 14, 2008, at Statuary Hall in the Capitol. Speakers included then-Senator Joe Biden, Bono of U2, Rep. Steny Hoyer, UN Secretary-General Ban Ki-moon, Israeli foreign minister Tzipi Livni, Speaker Nancy Pelosi, Secretary of State Condoleezza Rice, Rep. Christopher Shays and Elie Wiesel. He was buried in Congressional Cemetery in Washington, D.C.

A special election was held to fill his seat on April 8, 2008, and was won by former State Senator Jackie Speier, whom Lantos had endorsed.

On June 19, 2008, Bush posthumously awarded Lantos the Medal of Freedom. In a ceremony at the White House, Bush stated "We miss his vigorous defense of human rights and his powerful witness for the cause of human freedom. For a lifetime of leadership, for his commitment to liberty, and for his devoted service to his adopted nation, I am proud to award the Presidential Medal of Freedom, posthumously, to Tom Lantos, and proud that his loving wife Annette will receive the award on behalf of his family."

In 2008, the Congressional Human Rights Caucus, which he founded in 1983, was renamed The Tom Lantos Human Rights Commission. Its mission is partly "to promote, defend and advocate internationally recognized human rights." The first Lantos Human Rights Prize was presented to the 14th Dalai Lama in 2009. In 2011, the institute was set up in Budapest to promote tolerance and support minority issues in central and eastern Europe and in the world.

In the final weeks of his life, Lantos asked that a non-profit be established to carry on the work he felt so passionately about. The Lantos Foundation for Human Rights & Justice was founded later that year to carry out that wish. Lantos's daughter, Katrina Lantos Swett, serves as the Foundation's president and CEO.

On September 10, 2011, the Peninsula Humane Society & SPCA officially opened the Tom and Annette Lantos Center for Compassion, located at 1450 Rollins Road in Burlingame, California. The facility was funded with a naming gift in the Lantos's honor by Oracle founder, Larry Ellison, and his wife, Melanie.

- Tom Lantos Tunnels south of San Francisco have been named after the late Congressman, as has a street in Netanya, Israel.
- BBYO, Inc. (formerly B'nai B'rith Youth Organization) chapter honored Tom Lantos's legacy by naming the chapter in his honor. Lantos AZA #2539 now thrives in the Rockville, Maryland, area.

Budapest named a promenade in the city in honor of Lantos in 2016.

Lantos received the Grand Cross, Hungary's highest civilian honor.

== Congressional scorecards ==
See also

- Profile at Vote Smart^{[all links dead]}

Project Vote Smart provides the following results from congressional scorecards.

- American Civil Liberties Union – 91% for 2005–2006
- Americans for Democratic Action – 100% for 2006
- American Land Rights Association – 9% for 2006
- Americans for Tax Reform – 0% for 2006
- Animal Welfare Institute Compassion Index – 100% for 2007
- AFL–CIO – 100% in 2006
- Campaign for America's Future – 100% for 2005–2006
- Conservative Index (John Birch Society) – 11% for fall 2004
- Children's Defense Fund – 100% for 2006
- Drug Policy Alliance – 83% for 2006
- Drum Major Institute – 100% for 2005
- Family Research Council – 0% for 2006
- FreedomWorks – 0% for 2006
- Gun Owners of America – 0% for 2006
- Humane Society of the United States – 100% for 2005–2006
- League of Conservation Voters – 92% for 2006
- NARAL Pro-Choice America – 100% for 2006
- National Association of Wheat Growers – 37% for 2005
- National Education Association – 100% for 2005–2006
- National Federation of Independent Business – 14% for 2005–2006
- National Journal – Composite liberal score of 86.2% for 2006
- National Organization for the Reform of Marijuana Laws – 20 for 2006
- National Organization for Women – 95% for 2005–2006
- NRA Political Victory Fund – F for 2006
- National Right to Life Committee – 0% for 2005–2006
- National Taxpayers Union – 10% for 2006
- Population Connection – 100% for 2006
- Republican Liberty Caucus – 16% for 2005
- Secular Coalition for America – 70% on 2006 scorecards
- United States Chamber of Commerce – 33% for 2006

== Controversies ==
During a 1996 congressional inquiry into the Filegate scandal, Lantos told witness Craig Livingstone that "with an infinitely more distinguished public record than yours, Admiral Boorda committed suicide when he may have committed a minor mistake". Boorda, the Chief of Naval Operations, had taken his own life after his right to wear Combat V decorations had been questioned. Lantos was criticized by some (including fellow Congressman Joe Scarborough) for this comment.

On May 3, 2000, Lantos was involved in an automobile accident while driving on Capitol Hill. He drove over a young boy's foot and then failed to stop his vehicle and was later fined over the incident for inattentive driving.

In 2002, Lantos, who was on the House Committee on International Affairs, took Colette Avital, a Labor Party member of the Israeli Knesset, by the hand and, according to Haaretz, tried to reassure her with these words: "My dear Colette, don't worry. You won't have any problem with Saddam. We'll be rid of the bastard soon enough. And in his place we'll install a pro-Western dictator, who will be good for us and for you." He later denied saying this, but Avital confirmed it, according to Ben Terrall, a staff member of the congressional campaign of Maad H. Abu-Ghazalah, a Libertarian Party candidate who ran against Lantos that year.

In June 2007, Lantos called former German Chancellor Gerhard Schröder a "political prostitute" at the dedication ceremony of the Victims of Communism Memorial, which caused a political backlash from the German government. Lantos was referring to Schröder's ties to energy business in Russia, and remarked that this appellation would offend prostitutes.

In October 2007, Dutch parliamentarians said Lantos insulted them while discussing the war on terror by stating that the Netherlands had to help the United States because it liberated them in World War II, saying, "if it was not for us you would now be a province of Nazi Germany," and that "Europe was not as outraged by Auschwitz as by Guantanamo Bay."

On January 6, 2008, FBI whistleblower Sibel Edmonds included Lantos's photograph among others featured in the "State Secrets Privilege Gallery" posted on her website, composing images of figures considered to be relevant to her case. On August 8, 2009, she gave sworn testimony about Lantos and others during a witness deposition before the Ohio Elections Commission in the Schmidt v. Krikorian case, in which she alleged that he had engaged in "[N]ot only ... bribe[ry], but also ... disclosing highest level protected U.S. intelligence and weapons technology information both to Israel and to Turkey. ... other very serious criminal conduct."

== Electoral history ==
California's 11th congressional district: Results 1980–1990
Year	Democratic	Votes	Pct	Republican	Votes	Pct	3rd Party	Party	Votes	Pct	3rd Party	Party	Votes	Pct	
1980	Tom Lantos	85,823	46%	Bill Royer	80,100	43%	Wilson Branch	Peace and Freedom	13,723	7%	William S. Wade, Jr.	Libertarian	3,816	2%	*
1982	Tom Lantos	109,812	57%	Bill Royer	76,462	40%	Chuck Olson	Libertarian	2,920	2%	Wilson Branch	Peace and Freedom	1,928	1%	*
1984	Tom Lantos	147,607	70%	Jack Hickey	59,625	28%	Nicholas W. Kudrovzeff	American Independent	3,883	2%					
1986	Tom Lantos	112,380	74%	Bill Quraishi	39,315	26%									
1988	Tom Lantos	145,484	71%	Bill Quraishi	50,050	24%	Bill Wade	Libertarian	4,683	2%	Victor Martinez	Peace and Freedom	2,906	1%	*
1990	Tom Lantos	105,029	66%	Bill Quraishi	45,818	29%	June R. Genis	Libertarian	8,518	5%					

*Write-in and minor candidate notes: In 1980, Nicholas W. Kudrovzeff, American Independent Party, received 1,550 votes (1%). In 1982, Nicholas W. Kudrovzeff, American Independent Party, received 1,250 votes (1%). In 1988, Nicholas W. Kudrovzeff, American Independent Party, received 1,893 votes (1%).

California's 12th congressional district: Results 1992–2006
Year	Democratic	Votes	Pct	Republican	Votes	Pct	3rd Party	Party	Votes	Pct	3rd Party	Party	Votes	Pct
1992	Tom Lantos	157,205	69%	Jim Tomlin	53,278	23%	Mary Weldon	Peace and Freedom	10,142	4%	George O'Brien	Libertarian	7,782	3%
1994	Tom Lantos	118,408	67%	Deborah Wilder	57,228	33%								
1996	Tom Lantos	149,049	72%	Storm Jenkins	49,276	24%	Christopher V.A. Schmidt	Libertarian	6,111	3%	Richard Borg	Natural Law	3,472	2%
1998	Tom Lantos	128,135	74%	Robert Evans, Jr.	36,562	21%	Michael J. Moloney	Libertarian	8,515	5%				
2000	Tom Lantos	158,404	75%	Mike Garza	44,162	21%	Barbara J. Less	Libertarian	6,431	3%	Rifkin Young	Natural Law	3,559	2%
2002	Tom Lantos	105,597	68%	Michael Moloney	38,381	25%	Maad H. Abu-Ghazalah	Libertarian	11,006	7%				
2004	Tom Lantos	171,852	68%	Mike Garza	52,593	21%	Pat Gray	Green	23,038	9%	Harland Harrison	Libertarian	5,116	2%
2006	Tom Lantos	138,650	76%	Michael Moloney	43,674	24%								

== See also ==
- List of Jewish members of the United States Congress
- List of members of the United States Congress who died in office (2000–present)#2000s

U.S. House of Representatives
Preceded by William Royer	Member of the U.S. House of Representatives from California's 11th congressional district 1981–1993	Succeeded by Richard Pombo
Preceded by Tom Campbell	Member of the U.S. House of Representatives from California's 12th congressional district 1993–2008	Succeeded by Jackie Speier
New office	Chair of the House Human Rights Commission; 1983–1995	Succeeded by John Porter
Preceded by John Porter	Ranking Member of the House Human Rights Commission; 1995–2007	Succeeded by Frank Wolf
Preceded by Sam Gejdenson	Ranking Member of the House International Relations Committee; 2001–2007	Succeeded by Ileana Ros-Lehtinen
Preceded by Henry Hyde	Chair of the House Foreign Affairs Committee; 2007–2008	Succeeded by Howard Berman
Preceded by Frank Wolf	Chair of the House Human Rights Commission; 2007–2008	Succeeded by Jim McGovern
