= William Royer =

American politician (1920-2013)

William Howard Royer
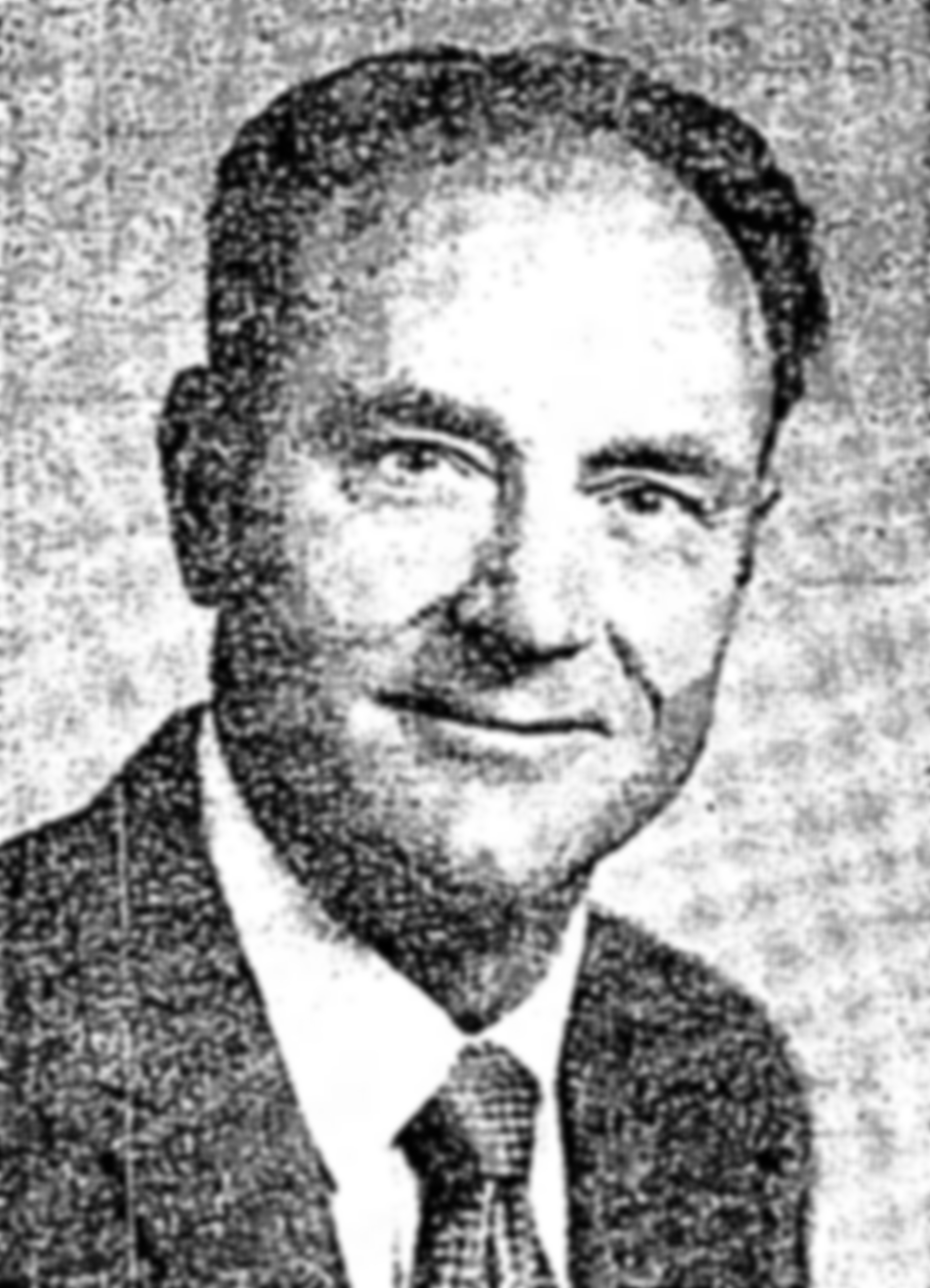

Member of the U.S. House of Representatives from California's 11th district
- In office April 3, 1979 – January 3, 1981
- Preceded by: Leo Ryan
- Succeeded by: Tom Lantos

Personal details
- Born: William Howard Royer; April 11, 1920 Jerome, Idaho, US
- Died: April 8, 2013 (aged 92) Redwood City, California, US
- Party: Republican
- Spouse: Shirley Wilson
- Children: 2
- Education: Santa Clara University, Oklahoma State University
- Occupation: Realtor, politician

William Howard Royer (April 11, 1920 – April 8, 2013) was an American politician and a member of the Republican Party. He served as a U.S. Representative from the 11th Congressional District of California from 1979 until 1981.

== Early life ==
Royer was born April 11, 1920, in Jerome, Idaho. His family moved to Redwood City, California. In 1938, Royer graduated from Sequoia High School.

== Education ==
He earned his B.S. at Santa Clara University in 1941 and did graduate work at what is now Oklahoma State University.

== Career ==
From 1943 to 1945, Royer served in the United States Army Air Forces. Afterward, Royer became a realtor and started Royer Realty Company.

Royer's political career began in 1950 when he was elected to the Redwood City Council, on which he would serve until 1966. From 1956 to 1960, Royer also served as mayor of Redwood City.

In 1972, Royer was elected to the San Mateo County Board of Supervisors, and was re-elected in 1976.

In 1979, Royer won a special election to succeed the late congressman Leo J. Ryan (D-San Mateo), winning with 57% of the vote. He finished the remainder of Ryan's term. In the 1980 election, Royer was defeated in his bid for a full term, losing 43.3%-46.4% to Democratic challenger Tom Lantos. Royer ran against Lantos again in 1982, losing 40%-57%.

== Personal life ==
Royer was married to the former Shirley Wilson. They had two sons, Dennis and Peter. Shirley Royer died in 2010; William Royer died April 8, 2013, in his Redwood City home of natural causes. He died three days before his 93rd birthday.

Royer's nephew Jim Hartnett is also a politician, serving as mayor of Redwood City.

== Electoral history ==
1979 Special election
Party	Candidate	Votes	%
Republican	William Royer	52,585	57.3
Democratic	G.W. "Joe" Holsinger	37,685	41.1
American Independent	Nicholas W. Kudrovzeff	770	0.8
Peace and Freedom	Wilson G. Branch	731	0.8
Total votes		91,771	100.0
Turnout			
Republican gain from Democratic			

1980 United States House of Representatives elections in California
Party	Candidate	Votes	%
Democratic	Tom Lantos	85,823	46.4
Republican	William Royer (Incumbent)	80,100	43.3
Peace and Freedom	Wilson G. Branch	13,723	7.4
Libertarian	William S. Wade Jr.	3,816	2.1
American Independent	Nicholas W. Kudrovzeff	1,550	0.8
Total votes		185,012	100.0
Turnout			
Democratic gain from Republican			

U.S. House of Representatives
Preceded by Leo J. Ryan	Member of the U.S. House of Representatives from California's 11th congressional district 1979–1981	Succeeded by Tom Lantos
