= Levi Tillemann =

American businessman, academic, and author (born 1981)

- Born: Levi Mills Tillemann-Dick; 1981 or 1982 (age 44–45); Denver, Colorado, U.S.
- Education: Regis University; Yale University (BA); Johns Hopkins University (MA, PhD)
- Occupations: Author, businessman
- Employer: New America Foundation

Levi Mills Tillemann-Dick (born November 25, 1981) is an American businessman, academic, and author. Currently managing partner at Valence Strategic, LLC and a fellow at the New America Foundation, he is also the author of the 2015 book, The Great Race: The Global Quest For The Car Of The Future (Simon and Schuster). Levi was also the lead author of the report Revolution Now, which he published while working in President Barack Obama's Department of Energy. He was an unsuccessful candidate in the Democratic primary in the 2018 election in Colorado's 6th congressional district.

== Early life and education ==
Tillemann's father, Timber Dick, was a businessman, inventor, and administrator at the University of Denver's School of Engineering and Computer Sciences. Timber, who was the son of Colorado's first female lieutenant governor, Nancy Dick, died from burn wounds following a 2008 automobile accident. Levi, with his brothers Corban and Tomicah, accepted the NASA "Create the Future" award for their work with their father on an ultra high-efficiency engine.

Tillemann's mother, Annette, is a Jewish convert to Mormonism and daughter of Tom Lantos. While serving on a mission, Levi left the faith when he was unable to reconcile the logical and liberal outlook his parents had instilled in him with perceived inconsistencies in church doctrine.

At fifteen, Tillemann started college at Regis University, transferring to Yale University at 16 where he graduated with honors. He then earned a PhD from Johns Hopkins University's School of Advanced International Studies in Japan and China studies. He speaks Chinese, Spanish, Portuguese and Japanese.

== Career ==
While in graduate school, Tillemann served as a researcher for Pulitzer Prize-winning economic writer Daniel Yergin. and, with his brother Corban, continued his father's efforts to develop radical new engine design that is much more efficient than a traditional internal combustion engine. In 2009, their startup, IRIS engines, won a $100,000 investment prize from venture firm Draper Fisher Jurvetson. The IRIS Engine also won numerous other awards, including in NASA's annual "Create the Future" design competition, ConocoPhillips' Energy Prize competition, and several university sponsored competitions.

The engine uses the walls of the chamber as a working surface, rather than the floor of the chamber, and in turn increases its working surface area from about 25% to more than 70%. Levi holds multiple U.S. and international patents for the IRIS design.

He served as a Special Advisor for Policy and International Affairs at the Department of Energy and chaired the Department's Autonomous and Connected Vehicles Energy Working Group. His is currently a Jeff and Cal Leonard Fellow at the New America Foundation and Managing Partner at Valence Strategic, LLC.

=== The Great Race: The Global Quest For The Car Of The Future ===
Tillemann's book, published in 2015 by Simon & Schuster, explains the $2 trillion global automotive industry and the competition between the U.S., Japan, and China to create the next generation of automobiles. He argues that strategic government policy plays a critical role in car development.

== 2018 U.S. House campaign ==
In May 2017, Tillemann announced the formation of an exploratory committee and the beginning of a listening tour to examine the feasibility of a congressional bid in Colorado's 6th congressional district. After a six-week listening tour, he officially announced his candidacy.

Tillemann was endorsed by state senator and speaker pro-tempore Rhonda Fields as well as the Denver chapter of the Progressive Democrats of America.

In April 2018, it emerged that Congressman Steny Hoyer and the Democratic Congressional Campaign Committee were supporting Tillemann's opponent, lawyer Jason Crow. In a recorded conversation, Hoyer urged Tillemann to drop out of the race. Hoyer acknowledged that the DCCC had already identified Crow as their choice candidate and discouraged a candid discussion about his weaknesses. Crow went on to win the primary and defeat Republican incumbent Mike Coffman in the general election.
