= Tessa Gräfin von Walderdorff =

21st-century American socialite

Tessa von Walderdorff
- Born: Tessa June Gräfin von Walderdorff; 20 February 1994 (age 32); New York City, U.S.
- Occupations: Real estate broker, socialite, writer, actress, model
- Spouse: Barron Nicholas Hilton II (m. 2018)
- Children: 3
- Parents: Count Franz von Walderdorff (father); Anna-Sabrina Brühwiler (mother)
- Family: Walderdorff family (by birth); Hilton family (by marriage)

Countess Tessa June von Walderdorff (German: Tessa June Gräfin von Walderdorff; born 20 February 1994), also known by her married name Tessa Hilton, is an American socialite, model, and real estate broker. She previously worked as an actress in short films, a freelance disc jockey, and was a writer for the German fashion and lifestyle magazine I Love You.

By birth, she is a member of the House of Walderdorff, a German noble family of Comital rank, and a descendant of the Löwenstein-Wertheim-Rosenberg branch of the House of Wittelsbach. Through her marriage to Barron Nicholas Hilton II, she became a member of the Hilton family.

== Early life and ancestry ==
Countess Tessa von Walderdorff was born on 20 February 1994 in New York City, as the elder daughter of photographer and artist Count Franz von Walderdorff (b. 1961) and his wife, Anna-Sabrina Brühwiler (b. 1963), also an artist. She is of German heritage on her father's side and of German, Swiss, French, and Danish heritage on her mother's side. Walderdorff spoke French as her first language, and later became fluent in German and in English.

She is a member of the German noble Walderdorff family and is a descendant of the German House of Löwenstein-Wertheim-Rosenberg, thus a morgnatic branch of the House of Wittelsbach, which ruled over the Kingdom of Bavaria. Through her father, Count Franz, Tessa is related to King Charles III and the British royal family, sharing mutual ancestry from Francis, Duke of Saxe-Coburg-Saalfeld and his second wife, Countess Augusta Reuss of Ebersdorf. As a child, Walderdorff spent a lot of time at Schloss Höfling, an 18th-century castle near Regensburg, Bavaria on lease to her family by the Princely House of Thurn and Taxis.

Walderdorff's paternal grandfather, Count Hugo von Walderdorff (1929–2008), left Germany during World War II to escape forced recruitment into the Hitler Youth. Her paternal grandmother is Countess Marie Josepha von Ballestrem (b. 1936), daughter of Princess Therese zu Löwenstein-Wertheim-Rosenberg (1909–2000) and a granddaughter of Aloysius, Prince of Löwenstein-Wertheim-Rosenberg and his wife, Countess Josephine Kinsky von Wchinitz und Tettau (1874–1946), who in turn was a great-granddaughter of Princess Sophie of Saxe-Coburg-Saalfeld, aunt of Queen Victoria and her husband, Albert, Prince Consort.

She has a younger sister, Countess Mia Rose von Walderdorff.

== Career ==
Walderdorff worked as a production assistant for Holly Li Productions during New York Fashion Week and Paris Fashion Week in 2012 and 2013.

Walderdorff made her film debut in the 2017 film Rosewood: The Best Version of Yourself directed by her uncle Dylan Verrechia. She played Jessica Cabot in the upcoming film Spring to Winter. Inspired by music she discovered while living in Berlin, and with her classical piano training, Walderdorff has done free-lance work as a disc jockey and has begun producing her own music.

Walderdorff is a licensed real estate agent and works as a salesperson for Hilton and Hyland, a real estate firm owned by Jeffrey Hyland and her father-in-law Richard Hilton.

Walderdorff has written two compilations of short stories and is publishing a series of children's books with Full Cycle Publications. She also writes for the Berlin-based I Love You magazine.

In September 2018 Walderdorff modeled for Marcel Ostertag's Spring 2019 collection at his show during New York Fashion Week.

== Personal life ==
Walderdorff attended the Ross School in East Hampton, New York. She graduated from Bard College in 2016, where she double majored in written arts and French and was a member of the tennis team.

Walderdorff met Barron Nicholas Hilton II, younger brother of Paris Hilton and Nicky Hilton Rothschild, at a restaurant in Saint Barthélemy in 2016, and began dating shortly after. Hilton proposed to Walderdorff on 17 September 2017 in Central Park. They announced their engagement via Instagram later that month. Walderdorff and Hilton were married in Gustavia; first in a civil ceremony at the town hall on 1 June 2018 and then in a religious ceremony at St. Bartholomew's Anglican Church on 3 June 2018. After the ceremony they had a reception at the Villa La Plage. The couple have a daughter and two sons.
