= Justin McAuliffe =

American entrepreneur and philanthropist (born 1987)

- Born: Justin Hawley McAuliffe; October 7, 1987 (age 39); New York City, US
- Education: Cornell University
- Occupations: Entrepreneur; philanthropist
- Relatives: Hilton family

Justin Hawley McAuliffe (born October 7, 1987) is an American entrepreneur and philanthropist. He is the grandson of Barron Hilton and the great-grandson of Conrad Hilton, founder of Hilton Hotels. He is the founder and CEO of Acceleron Digital, a digital marketing agency.

== Personal life ==
McAuliffe was born in New York City. He was raised in Greenwich, Connecticut, and is a graduate of Brunswick School. He is an alumnus of the Cornell University School of Hotel Administration.

== Career ==
McAuliffe is the founder and CEO of Acceleron Digital, a digital marketing agency focusing on web development and online promotions. Acceleron is also a start-up factory that develops and launches internal businesses.

He is an entrepreneur, having worked on several start-ups in the past. He worked on the Ready, Set, Travel concept, an airport security-friendly toiletry kit for travelers.

In 2019, he joined the board of the Conrad N. Hilton Foundation, which employs him as a Program-Related Investment Analyst.
