= Prince Alfred of Liechtenstein =

Prince Alfred of Liechtenstein may refer to:

- Prince Alfred of Liechtenstein (born 1842)
- Prince Alfred of Liechtenstein (born 1875), son of the preceding
