= Prince Alfred of Liechtenstein (1875–1930) =

Liechtensteiner prince

Prince Alfred Roman
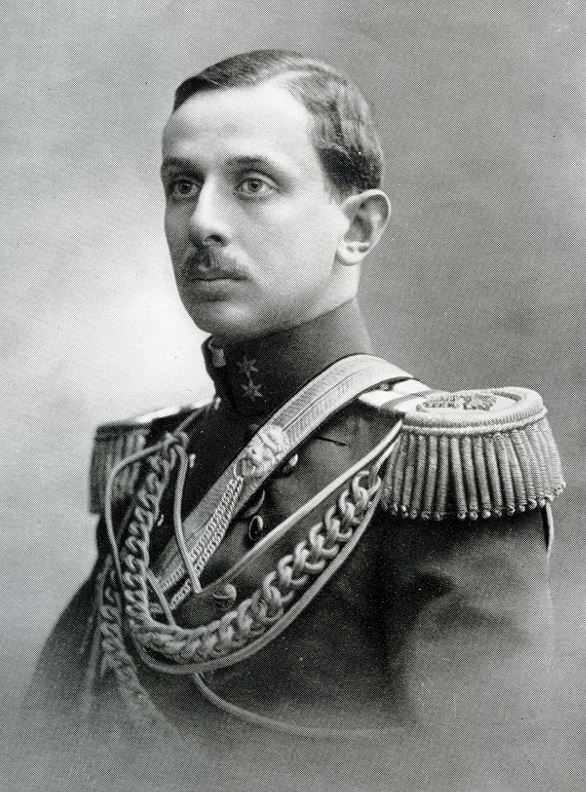
- Prince Alfred Roman in 1910

Acting Prime Minister of Liechtenstein
- In office 26 June 1928 – 4 August 1928
- Monarch: Johann II
- Preceded by: Gustav Schädler (As Prime Minister)
- Succeeded by: Josef Hoop (As Prime Minister)

Military service
- Allegiance: Austria-Hungary
- Branch/service: Austro-Hungarian Army
- Years of service: 1893–Unknown
- Rank: Captain
- Wars: World War I
- Born: 6 April 1875; Vienna, Austria-Hungary
- Died: 25 October 1930 (aged 55); Waldstein bei Peggau, Austria
- Spouse: Theresia Maria Prinzessin zu Oettingen-Oettingen und Oettingen-Wallerstein (m. 1912)
- Issue: Princess Maria Benedikta; Prince Hans-Moritz; Prince Heinrich; Princess Eleonore
- House: Liechtenstein
- Father: Prince Alfred of Liechtenstein
- Mother: Princess Henriette of Liechtenstein

Prince Alfred Roman of Liechtenstein (6 April 1875 – 25 October 1930) was a Liechtensteiner prince and uncle of Franz Joseph II. He was the sixth child and fourth son of Prince Alfred of Liechtenstein and Princess Henriette of Liechtenstein.

== Life ==
Prince Alfred joined the Austro-Hungarian Army in 1893 and was a captain during World War I, where he was seriously wounded.

He was briefly appointed by Johann II as acting Prime Minister of Liechtenstein from 28 June to 4 August 1928 after the government of Gustav Schädler was forced to resign as a result of a embezzlement scandal involving the National Bank of Liechtenstein. He was then succeeded by Josef Hoop following the 1928 Liechtenstein general election.

== Marriage and issue ==
He married on 19 February 1912, in Munich, Germany, Theresia Maria Prinzessin zu Oettingen-Oettingen und Oettingen-Wallerstein (Munich, 1 June 1887 – Waldstein bei Peggau, 29 May 1971).

They had four children:

- Princess Maria Benedikta Henriette Therese Gabriele Angela Ildefonsa (Munich, 21 March 1913 – Graz, 10 January 1992), unmarried and without issue
- Prince Johann Baptist Moritz (Hans-Moritz) Heinrich Alfred Ildefons Benedikt Maria Joseph (Waldstein bei Peggau, 6 August 1914 – Tulln an der Donau, 3 February 2004), married civilly in Burgweinting bei Regensburg on 1 November 1944 and religiously in Regensburg on 7 November 1944 Clotilde Prinzessin von Thurn und Taxis (b. Regensburg, 30 November 1922, daughter of Karl August, 10th Prince of Thurn and Taxis), and had issue:
  - Princess Diemut Margarete Maria Benedicta Anna (b. Vienna, 1 April 1949), married firstly civilly in Vaduz on 29 June 1982 and religiously in Heiligenkreuz, Lower Austria, on 17 July 1982 Ulrich Köstlin (b. Stuttgart, 31 December 1952), son of Heinrich Köstlin and wife Margot Ammann, and had issue:
    - Clemens August Köstlin (b. Berlin, 8 July 1983)
    - Luise Köstlin (b. Bogotá, 11 December 1984)
  - Prince Gundakar Albert Alfred Petrus (b. Vienna, 1 April 1949), married civilly in Dreux on 22 July 1989 and religiously in Friedrichshafen on 29 July 1989 Princess Marie Isabelle Marguerite Anne Geneviève d'Orléans (b. Boulogne-sur-Seine, 3 January 1959), daughter of Henri, comte de Paris, duc de France and Duchess Marie Therese of Württemberg, and had issue:
    - Princess Leopoldine Eleonore Therese Marie (b. Vienna, 27 June 1990)
    - Princess Marie Immaculee Elisabeth Rose Adelgunde (b. Vienna, 15 December 1991)
    - Prince Johann Wenzel Karl Emmeran Bonifatius Maria (b. Vienna, 16 March 1993)
    - Princess Margarete Franziska Daria Wilhelmine Marie (b. Vienna, 10 January 1995)
    - Prince Gabriel Karl Bonaventura Alfred Valerian Maria (b. Vienna, 6 May 1998)
  - Prince Alfred Heinrich Michael Benedikt Maria (b. Vienna, 17 September 1951), married civilly in Vaduz on 22 March 2002 and religiously in Waldstein on 6 April 2002 Raffaella Ida Sangiorgi (b. Tlemcen, Algeria, 12 December 1966), daughter of Tino Sangiorgi and wife Bruna Ferrari, without issue
  - Princess Adelgunde Maria Anna Therese Mafalda Eleonore (b. Vienna, 10 August 1953), unmarried and without issue
  - Prince Karl Emmeran Duarte Johannes Theobald Benedikt (b. Regensburg, 1 July 1955), unmarried and without issue
  - Princess Maria Eleonore Bernadette Hildegard (b. Vienna, 14 November 1958), unmarried and without issue
  - Prince Hugo Karl August (b. Vienna, 20 February 1964), married in Neresheim on 11 July 1998 and divorced Anabella Ohlmeier (b. Hamburg, 9 June 1971), daughter of Wolfgang Ohlmeier and wife Angela Maria Sendker, and had issue:
    - Princess Maria Aurelia Margarethe Antonia Angela Clotilde (b. Munich, 7 October 1998)
- Prince Heinrich Karl Vincenz Maria Benediktus Justinus (Graz, 5 August 1916 – Graz, 17 April 1991), 1,251st Knight of the Order of the Golden Fleece in Austria, married in Lignières on 12 September 1949 Archduchess Elisabeth of Austria (El Pardo, 31 May 1922 – Graz, 7 January 1993), daughter of Charles I of Austria and Zita of Bourbon-Parma, and had issue:
  - Prince Vincenz Karl Alfred Maria Michael et omnes sancti (Graz, 30 July 1950 – 13 January 2008), 1,300th Knight of the Order of the Golden Fleece in Austria, married firstly in Paris civilly on 5 March 1981 and religiously on 7 March 1981 and divorced in 1991 Hélène de Cossé-Brissac (b. Neuilly-sur-Seine, 26 September 1960), and had issue, and married secondly civilly in Vaduz on 20 May 1999 and religiously in Venice on 19 June 1999 Roberta Valeri Manera (b. Milan, 12 February 1953), daughter of Mario Valeri Manera and wife Maria Gaggia, without issue.
    - Princess Adelheid Marie Beatrice Zita (b. Vienna, 25 November 1981)
    - Princess Hedwig Maria Beatrice Hermine (b. Vienna, 28 November 1982)
  - Prince Michael Karl Alfred Maria Felix Moritz et omnes sancti (b. Graz, 10 October 1951), married civilly in Vaduz on 31 January 1986 and religiously in Baden-Baden on 8 February 1986 Hildegard Berta Peters (b. Mannheim, 12 February 1948), daughter of Robert Max Josef Peters and wife Bertha Elisabeth Beeck, and had issue:
    - Princess Therese Maria (b. Munich, 22 February 1987)
    - Princess Gisela Maria (b. Feldkirch, 26 June 1990)
  - Princess Charlotte Maria Benedikte Eleonore Adelheid et omnes sancti (b. Graz, 3 July 1953), married in Waldstein (Deutschfeistritz) on 31 August 1979 Pieter Kenyon Fleming-Voltelyn van der Byl (Cape Town, Western Cape, 11 November 1923 – Fairfield, Caledon, Western Cape, 15 November 1999), and had issue:
    - Pieter Vincenz (P. V.) van der Byl (b. Cape Town, 31 December 1980)
    - Valerian van der Byl (b. Cape Town, 7 July 1982)
    - Casimir van der Byl (b. Cape Town, 27 July 1990)
  - Prince Christof Karl Alfred Maria Michael Hugo Ignatius et omnes sancti (b. Graz, 11 April 1956), unmarried and without issue
  - Prince Karl Maria Alfred Michael Georg et omnes sancti (b. Graz, 31 August 1957), unmarried and without issue
- Princess Eleonore Henriette Maria Josefa Germana Ildefonsa (Waldstein, 28 May 1920 – Graz, 30 May 2008), unmarried and without issue

Prince Alfred Roman died on 25 October 1930.
