= Princess Marie of Liechtenstein =

Princess Marie of Liechtenstein may refer to:

- Marie, Princess of Liechtenstein (1940–2021), wife of Prince Hans Adam II of Liechtenstein
- Marie Fox, Princess Marie Henriette Adelaide of Liechtenstein (1851–1878), wife of Prince Louis of Liechtenstein
- Princess Marie of Liechtenstein (b. 1959), wife of Prince Gundakar of Liechtenstein
- Princess Marie Gabriele Franciska Kálnoky de Köröspatak of Liechtenstein (born 1975), wife of Prince Constantin of Liechtenstein
