= Richard Hilton =

American businessman (born 1950)

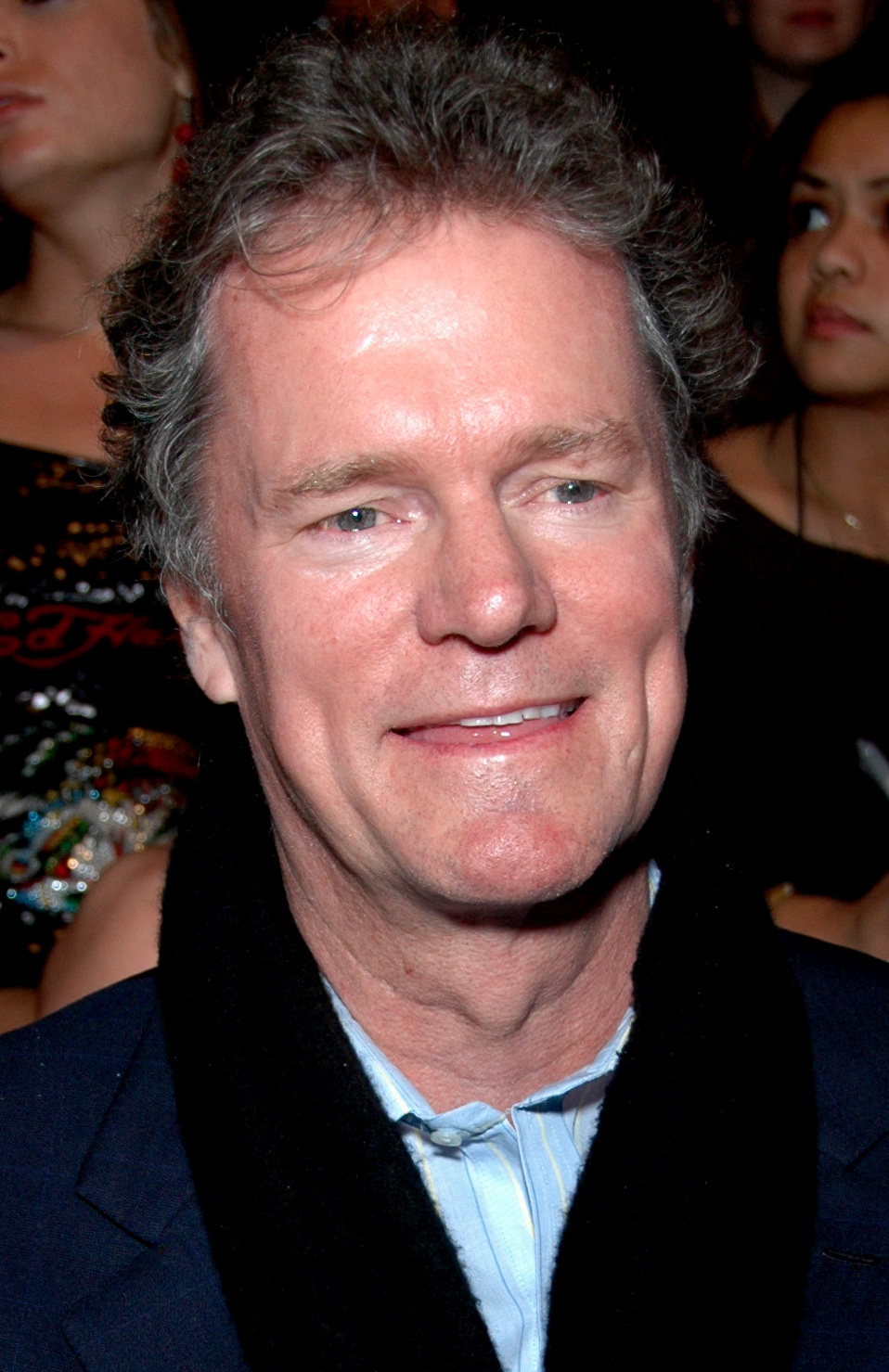
- Hilton in 2008
- Born: Richard Howard Hilton; August 17, 1955 (age 71); Los Angeles, California, U.S.
- Education: University of Denver (BS)
- Spouse: Kathy Avanzino (m. 1979)
- Children: 4, including Paris and Nicky
- Father: Barron Hilton
- Relatives: Hilton family

Richard Howard Hilton (born August 17, 1955) is an American businessman. He is the grandson of Hilton Hotels founder Conrad Hilton, and the father of socialite Paris Hilton. Hilton is the chairman and co-founder of Hilton & Hyland, a real estate brokerage firm based in Beverly Hills, California, that specializes in homes and estates in Beverly Hills, Holmby Hills, Bel-Air, Brentwood, Pacific Palisades, Malibu, and the Hollywood Hills, as well as estates from Santa Barbara to San Diego.

== Biography ==
=== Early life ===
Hilton was born in Los Angeles, California, the sixth of eight children to Marilyn June (née Hawley) and Barron Hilton, whose father was Hilton Hotels founder Conrad Hilton. In 1978, he graduated from the University of Denver with a degree in hotel and restaurant management. His siblings are: William Barron Hilton Jr. (born 1948), Hawley Anne Hilton (born 1949), Steven Michael Hilton (born 1950), David Alan Hilton (born 1952), Sharon Constance Hilton (born 1953), Daniel Kevin Hilton (born 1962), and Ronald Jeffrey Hilton (born 1963).

=== Career ===
Hilton joined the New York office of Eastdil Secured, a real estate investment banking firm and spinoff of Eastman Dillon. He specialized in securing participation of institutional investors and pension funds in various transactions.

In 1984, he formed Hilton Realty Investment to handle commercial real estate. He obtained his broker license on November 29, 1985. Hilton and Jeffrey Hyland were issued a corporation license for their firm Hilton & Hyland Real Estate, Inc. on July 26, 1993. Among their developments are Brentwood Country Estates. Former Million Dollar Listing cast members Chad Rogers and Josh Altman; Frank Robinson's daughter, Nichelle; Ron Kass's son, Robert; Anne Heche's former husband, Coleman Laffoon; Rayni Romito Williams and Branden Brent Williams (later founders of Williams & Williams), and Richard D. Zanuck's daughter-in-law, Marisa, have been among Hilton & Hyland's 106 salespeople. In 2012, Hilton & Hyland reported almost $3.5 billion in sales Since 2006, Williams & Williams has been affiliated with Hilton & Hyland Real Estate. The two companies joined forces to develop and distribute projects in the highly competitive real estate luxury market.

In February 2024, Hilton founded Hilton Hilton, a boutique brokerage headquartered in Beverly Hills, California. His son Barron and daughter-in-law Tessa serve as co-chief executives, with Hilton himself acting as chairman. In October 2024, the company announced a second office in Palm Beach, Florida, marking its first expansion outside California and extending its focus on high-end residential property.

=== Personal life ===
Hilton married Kathy Avanzino on November 24, 1979, when he was 24 years old and she was 20 years old. They have four children:

- Paris Hilton (born February 17, 1981)
- Nicky Hilton (born October 5, 1983)
- Barron Hilton II (born November 7, 1989), who married Tessa von Walderdorff
- Conrad Hughes Hilton (born March 3, 1994)

They live in Bel Air, Los Angeles. Hilton has eight grandchildren, two by Paris, three by Nicky and three by Barron.
