= Rudolf Graf Walderdorff =

Austrian malacologist and entomologist

Count Rudolf von Walderdorff (3 April 1830 – 3 July 1866) was an Austrian nobleman, malacologist and entomologist.

== Biography ==
Born Rudolph Carl Wilderich Graf von Walderdorff, a member of the Walderdorff family, an ancient German noble family originating in the Rhineland. He was a Captain in the Austrian Imperial Army. On 3 July 1866, Rudolf was killed in the Battle of Königgrätz.

== Works ==
Rudolf Graf Walderdorff (1864) System. Verzeichniss der im Kreise Cattaro (Süd-Dalmatien) mit Ausnahme der Biela-Gora und in einigen angrenzenden Theilen von Montenegro und türkisch Albanien vorkommenden Land- und Süsswasser-Mollusken. Verhandlungen der Zoologisch-Botanischen Gesellschaft in Wien. 14: 503- ]514.

- [Eupithecia actaeata] Correspondenz-blatt des Zoologisch-mineralogischen Vereins in Regensburg 23: 82
