= Flying-M Ranch =

American ranch and airfield in Lyon County, Nevada

Coordinates: 38°36′13″N 119°00′11″W

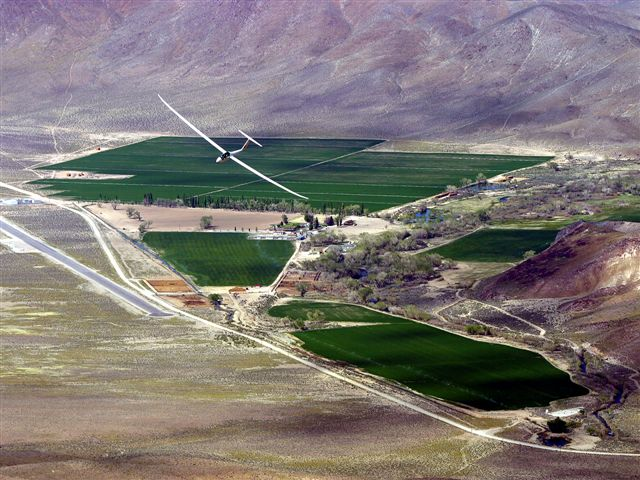
Schempp-Hirth Duo Discus gliding above the Flying-M Ranch

The Flying-M Ranch (sometimes referred to as the Hilton Ranch) is a ranch and airfield located in Lyon County, Nevada. The land, which was previously owned by hotel magnate Barron Hilton, was the base for many world-famous gliding competitions, including the biennial Barron Hilton Cup. The Ranch covers about 7,139 acres of land; it is located between the Wassuk Range and the Sweetwater Mountains, west of Hawthorne and about 75 mi (121 km) south of Reno, Nevada, United States. The ranch was named the Flying-M by its previous owner, Stanfield Murphy. Barron Hilton said he did not change the name because his wife, who died in 2004, was named Marilyn.

The ranch contains an airfield with a runway that is 5,500 by 50 feet (1,676 m × 15 m). A hangar on the airfield contains about a dozen historic aircraft, which are still airworthy. Because the surrounding desert offers good thermal soaring conditions, the airfield on the ranch was often used for gliding.

On September 3, 2007, aviator and adventurer Steve Fossett took off alone from the Flying-M Ranch in a Bellanca Super Decathlon, a single-engine two-seater airplane and never returned. An extensive search was launched but nothing was found for almost one year. On September 29, 2008, a hiker found Fossett's identification cards in the Ansel Adams Wilderness near Mammoth Mountain, at a height of 10,100 feet (3,100 m). The identification cards led to the discovery of airplane wreckage and human remains; the remains were subsequently identified by DNA analysis as belonging to Fossett.

In 2016, the ranch was sold to the National Fish and Wildlife Foundation. The purchase price was $19.4 million. The purpose of the sale was to acquire water rights to supply water to Walker Lake. The deal also included a life estate for Barron Hilton.
