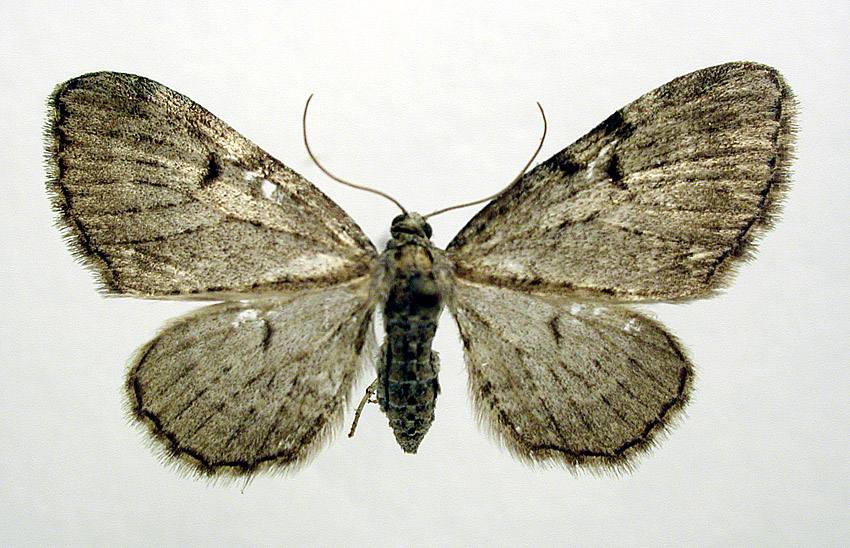

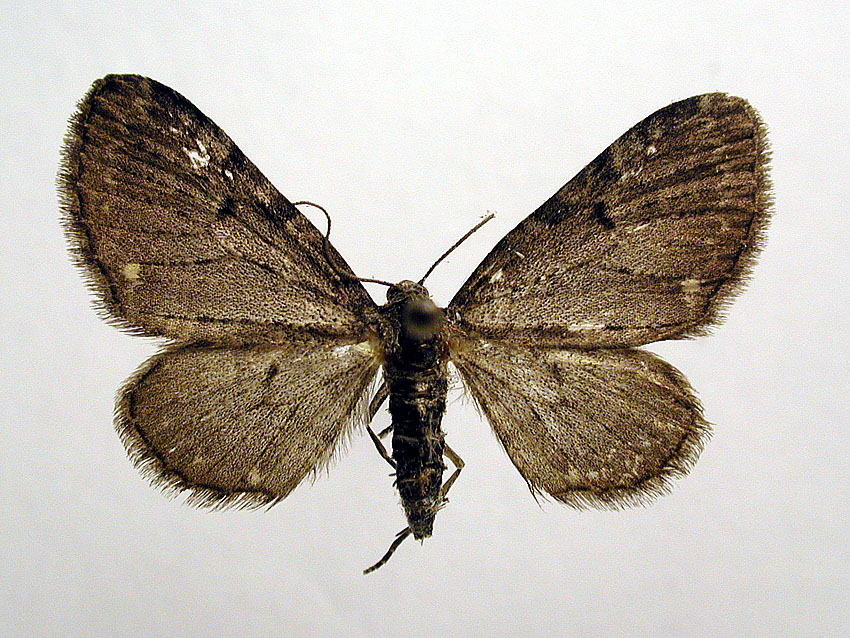

Scientific classification
- Kingdom: Animalia
- Phylum: Arthropoda
- Class: Insecta
- Order: Lepidoptera
- Family: Geometridae
- Genus: Eupithecia
- Species: E. actaeata

Binomial name
- Eupithecia actaeata Walderdorff, 1869

Synonyms
- Eupithecia bergunensis Dietze, 1875; Eupithecia acteata (misspelling); Eupithecia praenubilata Inoue, 1958

= Eupithecia actaeata =

Species of geometer moth

Eupithecia actaeata is a Eurasian species of moth of the family Geometridae. It was first recognised as a distinct species when Herrich-Schäffer described the adult moth from larvae and pupae collected by Hugo von Walderdorff on Actaea spicata.

== Description ==
=== Adult ===
E. actaeata has a wingspan of 19–24 mm, with broader wings than is typical for Eupithecia species. Both wing pairs are grey, brownish-grey, or brown, with somewhat paler hind than forewings.

A key identifying feature is a prominent black discal spot on the forewing, often accompanied by two darker spots near the leading edge, forming an approximate triangle. These markings help distinguish it from related species such as E. tripunctata. In contrast with several relatives, dark costal spots are normally present, and the inner transverse line may be faint.

=== Larva ===
Larvae hatch translucent whitish and gradually become green, with a bluish underside and yellowish segment divisions. The dorsal line is darker and semi-translucent, and the anal plate is reddish-brown. The head and thoracic legs are brownish-yellow with small black dots. Fine short black hairs are scattered on the body.

Mid-instar larvae sometimes develop reddish-brown, diamond-shaped markings along the middle abdominal segments, especially in captivity, though these marks are variable and often absent in wild specimens.

Larvae feed by creating circular holes from the centre of the leaf outward rather than starting at the edges. They usually remain motionless on the underside of leaves or along stems, blending in with the host plant.

=== Pupa ===
Pupation occurs in the soil within a loose cocoon. The pupa is short and stout, with green wing cases and a yellowish-brown posterior that darkens toward the cremaster, which bears small hooks for anchoring.

=== Egg ===
Eggs are deposited on the underside of Actaea leaves. They are glossy white, slightly oval, and typically one per leaf.

== Subspecies ==
- Eupithecia actaeata actaeata
- Eupithecia actaeata praenubilata Inoue, 1958

== Distribution ==
=== Europe ===
Within Europe, E. actaeata is found from France eastwards, where it is widely distributed in northern, central and eastern Europe, and has only local distribution south of the Alps.

=== Asia ===
In Asia, E. actaeata ranges from the southern Urals to Mongolia, China (Qinghai and Shaanxi), Japan, the Russian Far East, Taiwan and Korea.

== Habitat and host plants ==
E. actaeata has been found at altitudes from sea level up to 2000m in Europe and between 1600 and 3000m in China. It is found in forests with a presence of Actaea spicata (baneberry), its main host plant. In north-western Europe, it is found predominantly in closed spruce forests. In Asia, it has been found on another species of Actaea. Other known host plants are Thalictrum aquilegiifolium and Thalictrum flavum. Viburnum opulus has also been mentioned in scientific literature, but might be erroneous.

== Life cycle ==
Eupithecia actaeata generally produces two generations per year in favourable conditions. Eggs hatch after several days, and larvae develop for approximately four to six weeks.

The pupal stage usually lasts a few weeks, though some pupae overwinter before emerging as adults. Development time varies with environmental conditions, and under captive conditions a partial third generation may occasionally occur.

== Parasitoids ==
Larvae are commonly parasitised by ichneumonid wasps, which spin small black cocoons with pale bands. Jumping ichneumonid cocoons, similar to those recorded from E. trisignata, have also been observed in E. actaeata.
