= Princess Adelheid of Liechtenstein =

Liechtenstein princess (born 1981)

Princess Adelheid
- Countess von Coudenhove-Kalergil
- Born: November 25, 1981 (age 44); Vienna, Austria
- Spouse: Count Dominik von Coudenhove-Kalergi (m. 2009)
- Issue: Countess Xenia; Countess Tatiana; Countess Olympia
Names
- Adelheid Marie Beatrice Zita
- House: Liechtenstein
- Father: Prince Vincenz of Liechtenstein
- Mother: Hélène Herminie de Cossé-Brissac
- Occupation: economist businesswoman diplomat

Styles of Princess Adelheid von und zu Liechtenstein
- Reference style: Her Serene Highness
- Spoken style: Your Serene Highness

Princess Adelheid von und zu Liechtenstein (Adelheid Marie Beatrice Zita; born 25 November 1981) is a Liechtenstein businesswoman, economist, and diplomat. She is a member of the Princely family of Liechtenstein and serves as Liechtenstein's Honorary Consul to England.

== Early life and family ==
Adelheid was born in Vienna on 25 November 1981 to Prince Vincenz of Liechtenstein and Hélène Herminie Marie Hyacinthe de Cossé-Brissac. Adelheid is a granddaughter of Archduchess Elisabeth of Austria, the youngest daughter of Emperor Charles I of Austria and Princess Zita of Bourbon-Parma.

== Education ==
Adelheid was educated at Lycée Français de Vienne and St Mary's School Ascot. She earned a master's degree in international law and economics from IMADEC University.

== Career ==
From 2007 to 2011, Adelheid was employed as an economist for Credit Suisse's Middle Eastern markets.

In 2019, she was appointed as the first-ever representative of the Principality of Liechtenstein in England as an Honorary Consul.

In March 2022, Adelheid joined the governing board of LGT Wealth Management.

== Personal life ==
In 2009, she married Count Dominik Cornelius Valentin Gerolf Eugene von Coudenhove-Kalergi.
