= Helmut Reichmann =

German glider pilot (1941–1992)

Helmut Reichmann (1941 – March 10, 1992) was a German glider pilot, thrice World Gliding Champion, and co-founder, along with millionaire Barron Hilton, of the Barron Hilton Cup. He was an arts teacher and a professor of industrial design in his native Saarbrücken, in Germany.

Born in Wilhelmshaven, Reichmann was raised in Saarbrücken, where he eventually taught at the Institute for Sport Science. Reichmann earned his PhD at the University of Karlsruhe, with a thesis "On the Problem of Airspeed Optimization in Cross-Country Soaring Flight."

Reichmann started soaring in 1958 and soon achieved prominence as one of the most successful and influential people in the history of gliding:

- 1965 German Junior Champion
- 1968, 1971 and 1973 German National Champion
- 1970 and 1974 World Champion in the Standard Class
- 1978 World Champion in the 15-Metre Class
- 1978 FAI Lilienthal Gliding Medal, the highest honor in soaring
- 1973 to 1992, German National Team Coach.

Reichmann retired from competitive flying after his third world championship, wishing to dedicate more time to flight instruction in cross-country and competition soaring. He taught gliding at the Sports Studies Institute at the University of Saarbrücken, but he eventually moved to the university's Faculty of Fine Arts, where he taught experimental sculpture and design.

Reichmann was the author of two books on soaring:

- Streckensegelflug. Also available in English as Cross-Country Soaring, in French as La Course en planeur (Seidec edition, 1985), and in Spanish as Vuelo Sin Motor – Técnicas Avanzadas. It is still a primary reference on soaring.
- Segelfliegen – Die praktische Ausbildung. Also available in English as Flying sailplanes – A Practical Training Manual, and in Spanish as Vuelo Sin Motor – Enseñanza Practica. This has become a standard reference for pilots.

Reichmann died in the French Alps in 1992 when his Discus collided with an LS4 flown by Lars Gölz, who was also killed. Reichmann had been leading four members of a German squad at the time.

== Additional reading ==
- Reichmann, H. Streckensegelflug. Motorbuch Vlg., Stuttgart, 1975. English translation as Cross-Country Soaring published in 1978 by the Soaring Society of America, ISBN 1-883813-01-8.
- Reichmann, H. Segelfliegen – Die praktische Ausbildung. Motorbuch Vlg., Stuttgart. English translation as Flying sailplanes – A Practical Training Manual Thompson Publications 1980, ASIN B0006E1VSK.
