= Schloss Höfling =

Castle in Regensburg, Germany

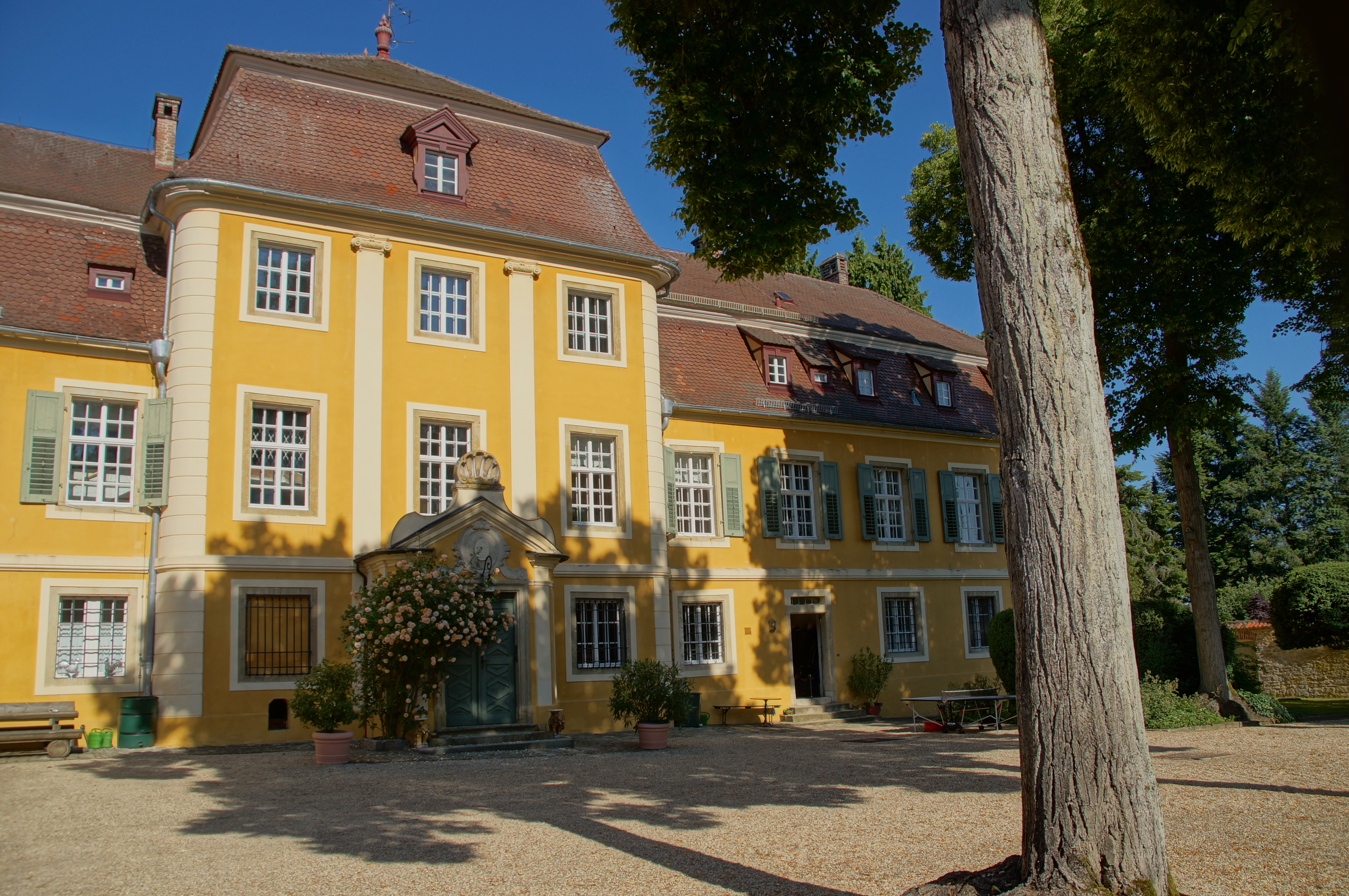

- Location within Bavaria Location within Germany
- 48.9733°N 12.1274°E
- Location: Regensburg; Upper Palatinate; Bavaria, Germany

Site notes
- Architectural styles: Baroque, mansard
- Owner: House of Thurn und Taxis

Schloss Höfling is a Baroque castle in Regensburg, Bavaria. In 1985 the castle, which is owned by the House of Thurn and Taxis, was leased for one hundred years to the Walderdorff family.

== History ==
The castle takes its name from the von Höfling family. The first mention of the name was Friedrich von Höfling, a provost of Prüfening Abbey in the 1150s. The first castle, a medieval fortress, was first mentioned in 1259 in a peace agreement between Louis II, Duke of Bavaria and the City of Regensburg. Louis II had occupied the castle and returned it to the citizens of the city. The Capellan family then owned it until it was sold to a monastery in 1265. The present castle was built in the 18th century by Baron Xaver Ignaz Reichlin von Meldegg, a member of the princely court of Thurn und Taxis. It was consecrated in 1755 in a Catholic ceremony. Baron Reichlin von Meldegg sold the castle in 1775 to Countess Maria Anna von Palm-Gündelfingen, née Baroness von Gumppenberg-Pöttmes (1746-1802). The present castle is in the baroque style and has a mansard roof. It later passed to the von Schmedel family. Count Wilhelm von Holnstein (1836-1898) bought the castle from Max Ritter von Schmaedel (1856-1939) in 1885. The land surrounding Schloss Höfling had been purchased in 1860 by Maximilian Karl, 6th Prince of Thurn and Taxis. In 1892 the House of Thurn und Taxis purchased the castle. After the wedding of Karl August, 10th Prince of Thurn and Taxis and Princess Maria Anna of Braganza, the couple took up residency at the castle in 1922. It was the birthplace of their son Johannes, 11th Prince of Thurn and Taxis. In 1985 the comital Walderdorff family signed a 100-year residential lease for the castle.
