= Barron Hilton Cup =

Worldwide soaring contest

BHC logo

The Barron Hilton Cup (BHC) was a worldwide soaring contest, founded by the late ex-chairman, president and chief executive officer of Hilton Hotels Corporation, Barron Hilton, and the late Prof. Dr. Helmut Reichmann. The European Aeronautic Defence and Space Company (EADS) was a partner in the event. The competition ran for 30 years, from 1980 through 2009. The winners of each two-year competition period were invited to a weeklong soaring camp at Barron Hilton's Flying-M Ranch in Nevada USA.

From 1986, the BHC was recognized by the International Gliding Commission as a Fédération Aéronautique Internationale first-category event. The purpose of the competition was to promote long-distance gliding and to strengthen gliding contacts between the participating nations.

The competition area was divided into five geographical regions of the world.

1. All of Europe and all of Asia except Japan
2. Eastern USA and Canada
3. Western USA, Central and South America
4. Australia and Africa
5. Japan and New Zealand
