= Hilton family =

Prominent American family

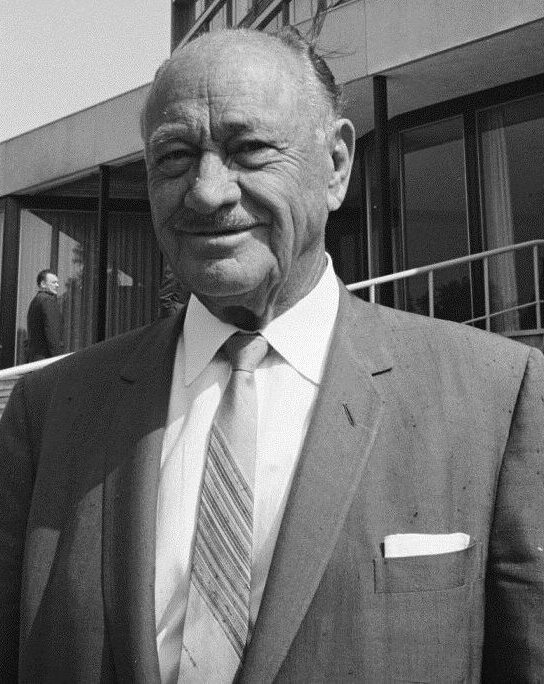
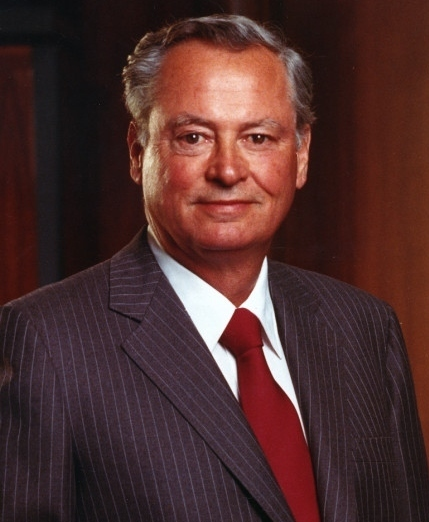
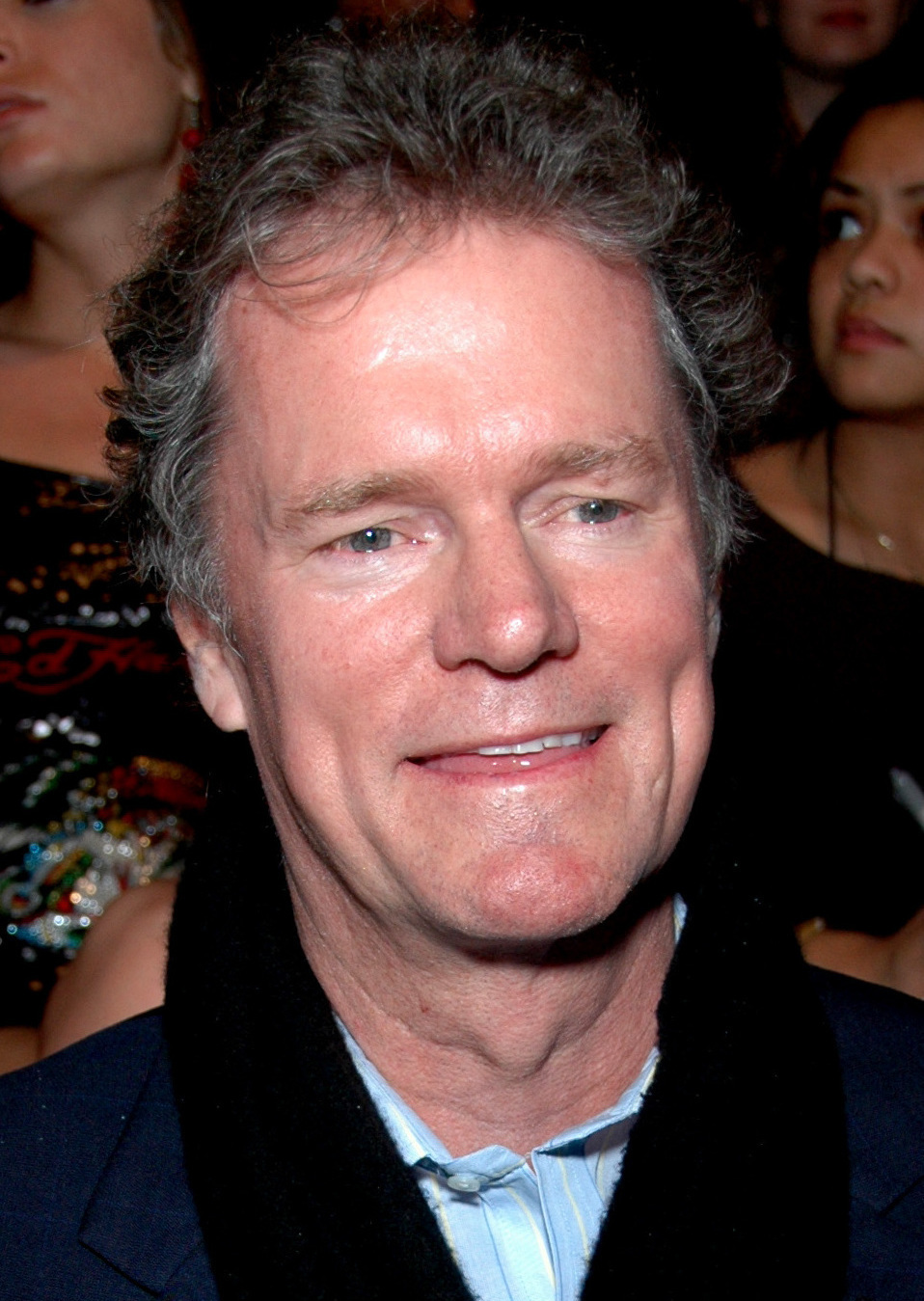
- Conrad Hilton Barron Hilton Richard Hilton
- Current region: New Mexico, New York, Pennsylvania, California, U.S.
- Origin: Kløfta, Norway
- Founded: 1870, San Antonio; 156 years ago
- Founder: Augustus Halvorsen Hilton
- Connected families: Rothschild family Walderdorff family Guinness family

The Hilton family is a wealthy American family of Norwegian origin. It is known for the multinational hospitality company Hilton Worldwide, established by Conrad Hilton in 1919, and for the celebrity Paris Hilton. Various members of the family have been involved in the hospitality business or have been socialites.

== Background ==
The Hilton family name originates from a farm in the traditional district of Romerike in Akershus county (fylke) of Norway and can be traced to the town of Kløfta since the late 18th century. The American branch of the family is descended from Augustus Halvorsen Hilton, who migrated from Norway to Iowa and then to San Antonio, New Mexico in the late 1870s. In the 1900 United States census, Hilton was listed as a dry goods merchant. His son Conrad Hilton, a second-generation American, is considered the founder of the modern Hilton family for starting the Hilton hospitality business.

== Family tree ==
- Halvor Nilsen Hilton (1810–1864), m. Karoline Hansdatter "Kari" Holum.

- Augustus Halvorsen "Gus" Hilton (1854–1919), m. Mary Genevieve Laufersweiler (1863–1956).

Gus emigrated to the United States in 1870.
- Felice A. Hilton (1885–1968)
- Conrad Hilton (1887–1979)
- Eva C. Hilton (1889–1979)
- Carl H. Hilton (1892–1957)
- Julian Hilton (1895–1897)
- Rosemary J. Hilton (1898–1995)
- August H. "Boy" Hilton (1901–1929)
- Helen A. Hilton (1906–2003)

=== Conrad Hilton descendants ===
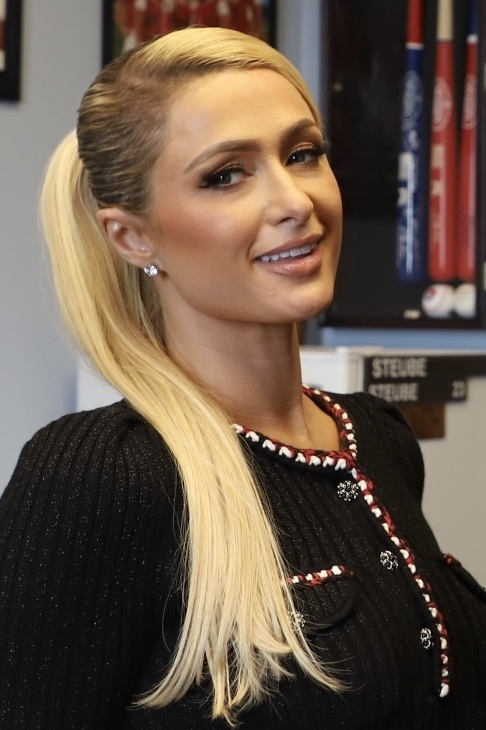
Paris Hilton, a prominent socialite and an heiress of the wealthy Hilton family

- By first wife Mary Adelaide Barron (m. 1925, div. 1934)

- Conrad Nicholson "Nicky" Hilton Jr. (1926–1969), m. Patricia "Trish" McClintock. He was also the first husband of Elizabeth Taylor (1932–2011; m. 1950, div. 1951), though they had no children together.

- Conrad Nicholson Hilton, III (b. 1960)
- Michael Otis Hilton (b. 1961), m. Babita Hilton.

- Michael Bradford Hilton (b. 1994)
- Kathryn Blake Hilton (b. 1999)
- Isabelle Hilton (b. 2008)

- William Barron Hilton (1927–2019), m. Marilyn Hawley.

- William Barron Hilton, Jr. (1948–2023)
- Hawley Anne Hilton (b. 1949), m. Jack McAuliffe

- Justin Hawley McAuliffe (b. 1987)

- Steven Michael Hilton (b. 1950)

- Nicholas Conrad Hilton (b. 1984)

- David Alan Hilton (b. 1952)
- Sharon Constance Hilton (b. 1953)
- Richard Howard Hilton (b. 1955), m. Kathy Avanzino (half-sister of Kim and Kyle Richards)

- Paris Whitney Hilton (b. 1981), m. Carter Milliken Reum in 2021
  - son (b. 2023)
  - daughter (b. 2023)
- Nicholai Olivia ("Nicky") Hilton (b. 1983), m. James Amschel Victor Rothschild in 2015

- daughter (b. 2016)
- daughter (b. 2017)
- son (b. 2022)

- Barron Nicholas Hilton II (b. 1989), m. Tessa Gräfin von Walderdorff in 2017

- daughter (b. 2020)
- son (b. 2022)
- son (b. 2024)

- Conrad Hughes Hilton (b. 1994)

- Daniel Kevin Hilton (b. 1962)

- Richard Douglas Hilton (b. 1990)

- Ronald Jeffrey Hilton (b. 1963)

- Eric Michael Hilton m. Patricia Ann Skipworth (1932–2016)

- Eric Michael Hilton, Jr. (b. 1955-2019)

- Caitlin Patricia Davis Hilton (b. 1994)

- Beverly Ann Hilton (b. 1956)
- Linda Hilton (b. 1963) m. Fabrizio Buschini in 1992

- Nicholas Angelo Buschini (b. 1993)m. Emily Rose Banas in 2022
- Brandon Alexandro Buschini (b. 1995)

- Joseph Bradley Hilton (b. 1967)

- Darren Joseph Hilton (b. 1995)
- Dean Bradley Hilton (b. 1995)
- Allison Elaine Hilton (b. 2002)

- By second wife Zsa Zsa Gabor (1917–2016; m. 1942, div. 1946)

- Constance Francesca Gabor Hilton (1947–2015) Francesca was the only child born to any of the Gabor sisters. She had no children and was divorced.

- No children by third wife Mary Frances Kelly (m. 1976).
