= Vincenz Liechtenstein =

Austrian politician (1950–2008)

Prince Vincenz
- Born: 30 July 1950; Graz, Austria
- Died: 14 January 2008 (aged 57); Deutschfeistritz, Styria
- Burial: St. Florian Cathedral, Vaduz, Liechtenstein
- Spouse: Hélène de Cossé-Brissac (m. 1981; div. 1991) Roberta Valeri Manera (m. 1999; died 2008)
- Issue: Princess Adelheid; Princess Hedwig
Names
- Vincenz Karl Alfred Maria Michael
- House: Liechtenstein
- Father: Prince Heinrich of Liechtenstein
- Mother: Archduchess Elisabeth of Austria

Prince Vincenz of Liechtenstein (Vincenz Karl Alfred Maria Michael; 30 July 1950 – 14 January 2008), known in Austria as Vincenz Liechtenstein, was an Austrian politician and member of the Austrian People's Party. He was a grandson of Charles I of Austria, the last Austrian Emperor. He was born a Prince of Liechtenstein. He never renounced his succession to the Liechtensteiner throne, but since the nobility in Austria was officially abolished in 1919 after the fall of the Austro-Hungarian Empire, he did not use his princely title or honorific (Serene Highness) in his Austrian civic life.

== Ancestry ==
Born His Serene Highness Prince Vincenz Karl Alfred Maria Michael of Liechtenstein (Germ. Seine Durchlaucht der Prinz Vincenz Karl Alfred Maria Michael von und zu Liechtenstein), the first child of Prince Heinrich of Liechtenstein and Archduchess Elisabeth of Austria. Prince Heinrich was a son of Prince Alfred Roman of Liechtenstein (himself a son of Prince Alfred of Liechtenstein) and Princess Theresia Maria of Oettingen-Oettingen. Vincenz was thus a male-line great-great-great-grandson of Johann I Joseph, Prince of Liechtenstein. Vincenz' mother, Archduchess Elisabeth, was the youngest daughter of Charles I, the last Emperor of Austria, and his wife, Zita of Bourbon-Parma. Vincenz Liechtenstein is a female-line great-grandson of Robert I, the last sovereign Duke of Parma.

== Marriage ==
Vincenz was 1,300th Knight of the Order of the Golden Fleece in Austria. On 7 March 1981, at the Church of Saint-Louis des Invalides in Paris, he married Hélène Herminie Marie Hyacinthe de Cossé-Brissac (1960–), a descendant of the French Ducs de Brissac, with Prince Wenzeslaus of Liechtenstein as page boy.

They had two daughters:

- Her Serene Highness Princess Adelheid Marie Beatrice Zita (b. Vienna, 25 November 1981), married in Schloss Waldstein on 31 January 2009 Count Dominik Cornelius Valentin Gerold Eugene von Coudenhove-Kalergi (b. London, 7 October 1973), son of Count Hans Heinrich von Coudenhove Kalergi and Cornelia Carter Roberts. They have three daughters:
  - Countess Xenia Marie Cornelia Hélène Zita Anne Therese Hildegard et omnes Sancti von Coudenhove-Kalergi (b. Graz, 21 October 2011)
  - Countess Tatiana Marie Mitsuko Benedikta Zita Sophie Ferdinandine Gisela et omnes Sancti von Coudenhove-Kalergi (b. Graz, 6 May 2013)
  - Countess Olympia Marie Gladys Zita Barbara Mauricette Helena et omnes Sancti von Coudenhove-Kalergi (b. Graz, 1 September 2016)
- Her Serene Highness Princess Hedwig Maria Beatrice Hermine (b. Vienna, 28 November 1982), married in 2008 to Count Olivier de Quélen Cansou and divorced in 2020. They have four children:
  - Countess Maïwenn Marie Éléonore de Quélen (b. 23 April 2010)
  - Countess Béatrice de Quélen (b. 10 June 2011)
  - Countess Raphaëlle de Quélen (b. 10 June 2011)
  - Count Taliesin Amedeo François de Quélen (b. 29 August 2015)

Vincenz and Helene divorced in 1991 and the marriage was annulled in 1994.

He then married Roberta Valeri Manera (1953–) in Venice on 19 June 1999: the couple had no children.

== Career ==
Vincenz studied at the Bundesrealgymnasium in Graz (1960–1969) and subsequently studied law at the University of Graz (1969–1975). He worked at a forestry company before becoming a politician. He was co-founder of the 1974 JES students initiative. He was a member of the board of the Catholic Family Association and the Sudetendeutsche Landsmannschaft.

Vincenz was a member of the Nationalrat from 1988 to 1996 and again from 1997 to 2004. From 2004 to 2006 he was a member of the Bundesrat. He caused a mini-scandal in 2005 when he interrupted a Nationalrat meeting because of alleged drunkenness. He apologised shortly afterward.

Liechtenstein died unexpectedly on 14 January 2008 at his home, Schloss Waldstein (Deutschfeistritz), at Deutschfeistritz near Graz, following a short illness. He had left his sickbed to attend the funeral of his uncle Archduke Carl-Ludwig in Vienna.
