= Walderdorff =

German noble family

- Noble dynasty
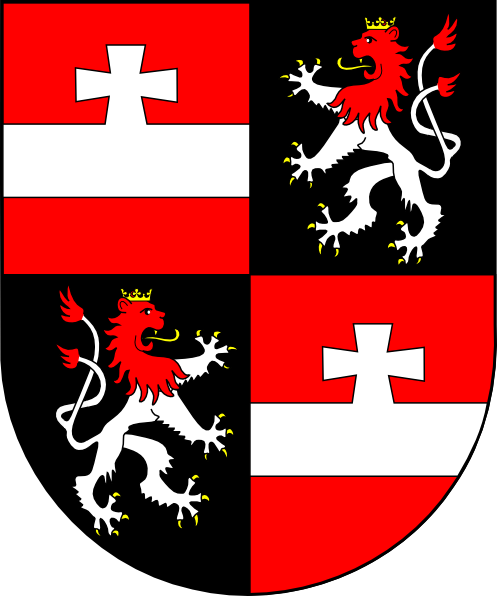
- Founded: Being first mentioned as member of the Uradel 1198, Rhineland; 828 years ago
- Titles: Imperial Knight of Walderdorff; Count of Walderdorff
- Connected families: Hilton family
- Traditions: Catholicism
- Estate: Molsberg Castle

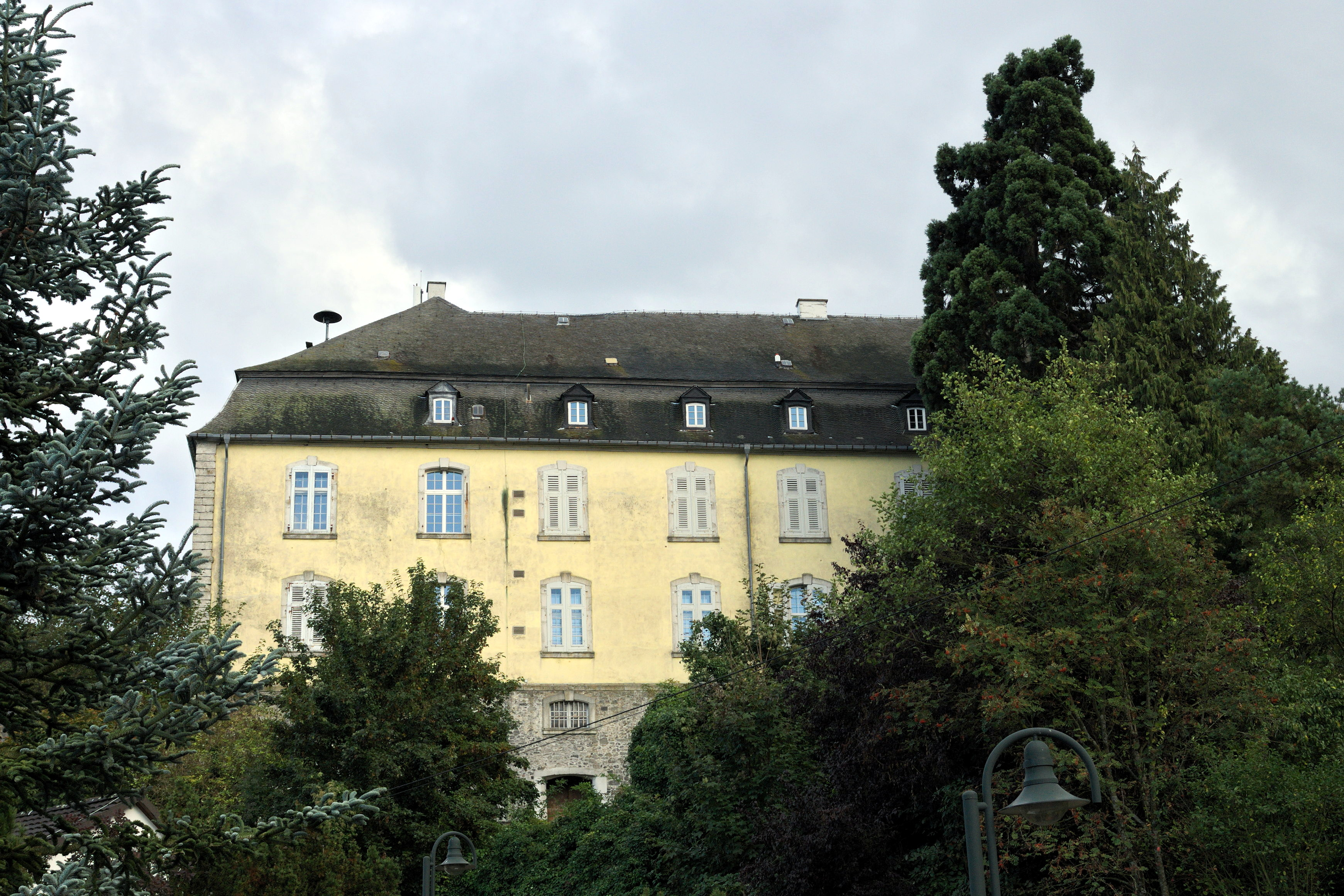
Ancestral family seat: Schloss Molsberg

The House of Walderdorff is the name of an old and distinguished German noble family, whose members occupied many important ecclesiastical positions within the Holy Roman Empire.

Since the 17th century the family has been residing on Molsberg Castle in the then Duchy of Nassau. Later several members settled and became wealthy residing in Hesse as well as in the Kingdom of Bavaria and Kingdom of Prussia.

In the 20th century one branch originally from Wiesbaden settled in the United States of which Tessa Gräfin von Walderdorf is an offspring. On 1 June 2018, she would marry Barron Nicholas Hilton II (b. 1989), a member of the Hilton family and younger brother of Paris Hilton and Nicky Rothschild.

== History ==
First mentioned in 1198, the Walderdorff family belongs to the Uradel of the Rhineland and has strong historic ties to the Catholic Church. Members of the family originally held the rank of Imperial Knight, and were later elevated to baronial rank on 1 September 1663 by Leopold I, Holy Roman Emperor and later to comital rank, on 12 August 1754 by Francis I, Holy Roman Emperor. Since 1657 the family's ancestral seat has been Molsberg Castle in Westerwaldkreis, Rhineland-Palatinate. Today, the family also resides in Schloss Höfling, Regensburg, Bavaria, leased to them in 1985 for one hundred years by its owners, members of the House of Thurn und Taxis.

== Notable family members ==
- Wilderich von Walderdorff (1617–1680), Prince-Bishop of Vienna
- Johann IX Philipp von Walderdorff (1701–1768), Archbishop-Elector of Trier and Prince-Bishop of Worms
- Wilderich of Walderdorf (1739–1810), Prince-Bishop of Speyer
- Rudolf Graf Walderdorff (1830–1866), Austrian nobleman, malacologist and entomologist
- Tessa Gräfin von Walderdorff (b. 1994), American socialite and by marriage member of the Hilton family
