= Johannes von Thurn and Taxis =

Johannes
- 11th Prince of Thurn and Taxis
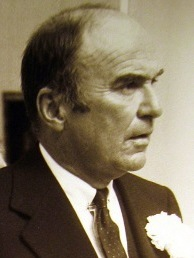
- Johannes in 1981

Head of the House of Thurn and Taxis
- Tenure: 26 April 1982 – 14 December 1990
- Predecessor: Karl August
- Successor: Albert II
- Born: 5 June 1926; Schloss Höfling, Regensburg, Free State of Bavaria, Weimar Republic
- Died: 14 December 1990 (aged 64); Munich, Bavaria, Germany
- Burial: Gruftkapelle, Schloss Thurn und Taxis, Regensburg, Bavaria, Germany
- Spouse: Countess Mariae Gloria of Schönburg-Glauchau (m. 1980)
- Issue: Princess Maria Theresia; Princess Elisabeth; Albert, 12th Prince of Thurn and Taxis
Names
- German: Johannes Baptista de Jesus Maria Louis Miguel Friedrich Bonifazius Lamoral
- House: Thurn and Taxis
- Father: Karl August, 10th Prince of Thurn and Taxis
- Mother: Infanta Maria Anna of Portugal
- Religion: Roman Catholic

Johannes, 11th Prince of Thurn and Taxis (Johannes Baptista de Jesus Maria Louis Miguel Friedrich Bonifazius Lamoral; 5 June 1926 – 14 December 1990) was a German businessman and head of the House of Thurn und Taxis from 1982 until his death.

== Early life ==
Johannes was born at Schloss Höfling in Regensburg, Germany, to Karl August, 10th Prince of Thurn and Taxis, and Infanta Maria Anna de Braganza. He had two older sisters and one younger brother.

== Marriage and family ==
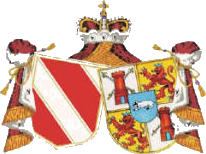
Arms of alliance of Schönburg-Glauchau and Thurn und Taxis families

In the 1970s Johannes threw avant-garde parties and, because he was bisexual, he was often seen in gay discos. Before he was married, his "permanent companion" was Princess Henriette von Auersperg (1933-2019).

On 31 May 1980 he married the much younger Countess Gloria of Schönburg-Glauchau (born 1960), who was also bisexual. The pair were fourth cousins twice removed, both descended from Karl Alexander, 5th Prince of Thurn and Taxis. The Schönburg-Glauchaus were a countly branch of the mediatised princely House of Schönburg, which still possessed large estates in Germany after World War I, but became refugees in Africa under the Nazi regime and fell on hard times. The couple attracted massive media attention into the mid 1980s, with a haut bohème lifestyle locating them among the jet set and the Princess Gloria's over-the-top appearance (characterized by bright hair color and flashy clothes) prompted Vanity Fair to describe her as "Princess TNT, the dynamite socialite", a sobriquet that stayed with her a long time. The couple had three children:

- Maria Theresia Ludowika Klothilde Helene Alexandra (born 28 November 1980 in Regensburg). On 13 September 2014, she married Hugo Wilson, a British artist, in Tutzing, Germany. They have two daughters.
- Elisabeth Margarethe Maria Anna Beatriz (born 24 March 1982 in Regensburg).
- Albert (II.) Maria Lamoral Miguel Johannes Gabriel (born 24 June 1983 in Regensburg).

Upon the death of his father in 1982, Johannes became the head of the Thurn and Taxis family. He died on 14 December 1990 after two unsuccessful heart transplants within two days, in Munich-Großhadern. With a legacy of U.S. $500 million in debts, his widow was forced to simplify her way of life to master the fiscal responsibilities of probating his estate and securing what remained of her husband's fortune.

== Honours ==
=== Dynastic honours ===
Dynastic orders of non-reigning families:

- House of Thurn und Taxis: Sovereign Knight Grand Cross of the Order of Parfaite Amitié
- Saxon Royal Family: Knight Grand Cross of the Order of the Rue Crown
- Portuguese Royal Family: Knight Grand Cross of the Order of the Immaculate Conception of Vila Viçosa

=== National and foreign honours ===
- Commander of the Order of Merit of the Federal Republic of Germany
- Sovereign Military Order of Malta: Bailiff Knight Grand Cross of Honour and Devotion of the Sovereign Military Order of Malta, 3rd First Class

== Ancestry ==
Ancestors of Johannes von Thurn and Taxis

8. Maximilian Anton, Hereditary Prince of Thurn and Taxis
4. Albert I, Prince of Thurn and Taxis
9. Duchess Helene in Bavaria
2. Karl August, Prince of Thurn and Taxis
10. Archduke Joseph Karl, Palatine of Hungary
5. Archduchess Margarethe Klementine of Austria
11. Princess Clotilde of Saxe-Coburg and Gotha
1. Johannes, Prince of Thurn and Taxis
12. Miguel I of Portugal
6. Miguel Januário, Duke of Braganza
13. Princess Adelaide of Löwenstein-Wertheim-Rosenberg
3. Princess Maria Ana of Braganza
14. Charles, Prince of Löwenstein-Wertheim-Rosenberg
7. Princess Maria Theresa of Löwenstein-Wertheim-Rosenberg
15. Princess Sophie of Liechtenstein

== Sources ==
Styles of Johannes, Prince of Thurn and Taxis
- Reference style: His Serene Highness
- Spoken style: Your Serene Highness

- Wolfgang Behringer. Thurn und Taxis: Die Geschichte ihrer Post und ihrer Unternehmen. München/Zürich: 1990. ISBN 3-492-03336-9
- Martin Dallmeier and Martha Schad. Das Fürstliche Haus Thurn und Taxis, 300 Jahre Geschichte in Bildern. Regensburg: 1996. ISBN 3-7917-1492-9
- Bernd-Ulrich Hergemöller. Mann für Mann. page 689

Johannes von Thurn and Taxis House of Thurn and Taxis Cadet branch of the House of Tassis Born: 5 June 1926 Died: 14 December 1990
German nobility
Preceded by Karl August	Prince of Thurn and Taxis; 26 April 1982 – 14 December 1990	Succeeded by Albert II
