= Karl August, 10th Prince of Thurn and Taxis =

Karl August
- Prince of Thurn and Taxis
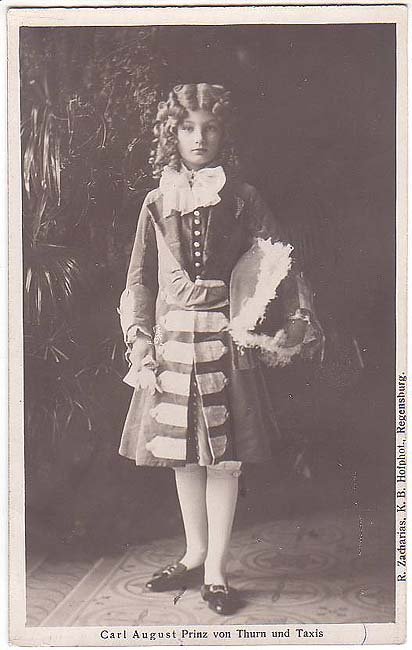
- Karl August in 1911, aged 12

Head of the House of Thurn and Taxis
- Tenure: 13 July 1971 – 26 April 1982
- Predecessor: Franz Joseph
- Successor: Johannes
- Born: 23 July 1898; Schloss Garatshausen, Feldafing, Kingdom of Bavaria, German Empire
- Died: 26 April 1982 (aged 83); Regensburg, Bavaria, Germany
- Burial: Gruftkapelle, Saint Emmeram's Abbey, Regensburg
- Spouse: Princess Maria Anna of Braganza (m. 1921; died 1971)
- Issue Detail: Princess Clotilde; Princess Mafalda; Johannes, 11th Prince of Thurn and Taxis; Prince Albert
Names
- German: Karl August Joseph Maria Maximilian Lamoral Antonius Ignatius Benediktus Valentin
- House: Thurn and Taxis
- Father: Albert, 8th Prince of Thurn and Taxis
- Mother: Archduchess Margarethe Klementine of Austria
- Religion: Roman Catholic

Karl August Joseph Maria Maximilian Lamoral Antonius Ignatius Benediktus Valentin, 10th Prince of Thurn and Taxis (full German name: Karl August Joseph Maria Maximilian Lamoral Antonius Ignatius Benediktus Valentin Fürst von Thurn und Taxis; 23 July 1898 – 26 April 1982) was the tenth Prince of Thurn and Taxis and Head of the Princely House of Thurn and Taxis from 13 July 1971 until his death on 26 April 1982.

== Early life and education ==
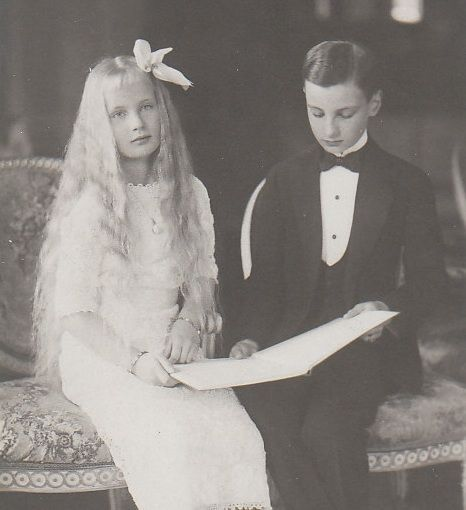
Karl August with his sister Elisabeth, 1910s

Karl August was the third son and child of Albert, 8th Prince of Thurn and Taxis, and his wife, Archduchess Margarethe Klementine of Austria. After graduating from a local high school, Karl August studied science at the University of Würzburg.

== Marriage and family ==
Karl August married Infanta Maria Ana of Portugal, daughter of Miguel, Duke of Braganza, and his wife Princess Maria Theresa of Löwenstein-Wertheim-Rosenberg, on 18 August 1921 at Schloss Taxis in Dischingen, Baden-Württemberg, Germany. Karl August and Maria Ana had four children:

- Princess Clotilde of Thurn and Taxis (30 November 1922 – 1 September 2009) married Prince Hans-Moritz of Liechtenstein (son of Prince Alfred Roman of Liechtenstein). Clotilde and Hans-Moritz are the parents of Prince Gundakar of Liechtenstein.
- Princess Mafalda of Thurn and Taxis (6 March 1924 – 24 July 1989) married Prince Franz of Thurn and Taxis (a distant cousin)
- Johannes, 11th Prince of Thurn and Taxis (5 June 1926 – 14 December 1990) married Countess Gloria von Schonbürg-Glauchau (daughter of Joachim, Count of Schönburg-Glauchau and Countess Beatrix Széchenyi de Sárvár-Felsővidék)
- Prince Albert of Thurn and Taxis (23 January 1930 – 4 February 1935)

After his marriage, Karl August and his wife resided at Schloss Höfling in Regensburg where he managed the family's agricultural interests in nearby Burgweinting. As a committed opponent to Nazism, Karl August forbade his children, after the Machtergreifung, to join the Hitler Youth.

== World War II ==
Because of his anti-Nazi attitude, Karl August was imprisoned in a Gestapo prison in Landshut from 1944 to 1945.

== Later life ==
Styles of Karl August, Prince of Thurn and Taxis
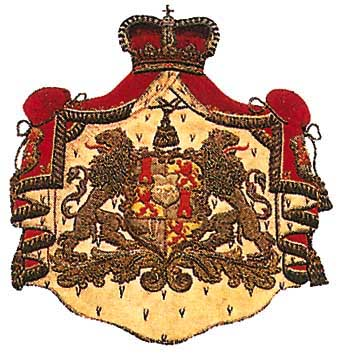
- Reference style: His Serene Highness
- Spoken style: Your Serene Highness

After the death of his elder brother Franz Josef in 1971, Karl August was aged 73 when he succeeded as Head of the House of Thurn and Taxis. During this time, he was responsible for the modernization of the agricultural and forestry possessions of the House of Thurn and Taxis, and he built homes for his workers and employees.

In addition, he supported the continued preservation of the cultural-historical heritage of the House of Thurn and Taxis. Karl August restored interior parts of Saint Emmeram's Abbey, as well as tapestries from the 17th and 18th centuries.

After his death on 26 April 1982, Karl August was entombed in the chapel of Saint Emmeram's Abbey.

== Ancestry ==
Ancestors of Karl August, 10th Prince of Thurn and Taxis

8. Maximilian Karl, 6th Prince of Thurn and Taxis
4. Maximilian Anton, Hereditary Prince of Thurn and Taxis
9. Baroness Wilhelmine of Dörnberg
2. Albert, 8th Prince of Thurn and Taxis
10. Duke Maximilian Joseph in Bavaria
5. Duchess Helene in Bavaria
11. Princess Ludovika of Bavaria
1. Karl August, 10th Prince of Thurn and Taxis
12. Archduke Joseph, Palatine of Hungary
6. Archduke Joseph Karl, Palatine of Hungary
13. Duchess Maria Dorothea of Württemberg
3. Archduchess Margarethe Klementine of Austria
14. Prince August of Saxe-Coburg and Gotha
7. Princess Clotilde of Saxe-Coburg and Gotha
15. Princess Clémentine of Orléans

Karl August, 10th Prince of Thurn and Taxis House of Thurn and Taxis Cadet branch of the House of Tassis Born: 23 July 1898 Died: 26 April 1982
German nobility
Preceded by Franz Joseph	Prince of Thurn and Taxis; 13 July 1971 – 26 April 1982	Succeeded by Johannes
