= Deutschfeistritz =

- Municipality
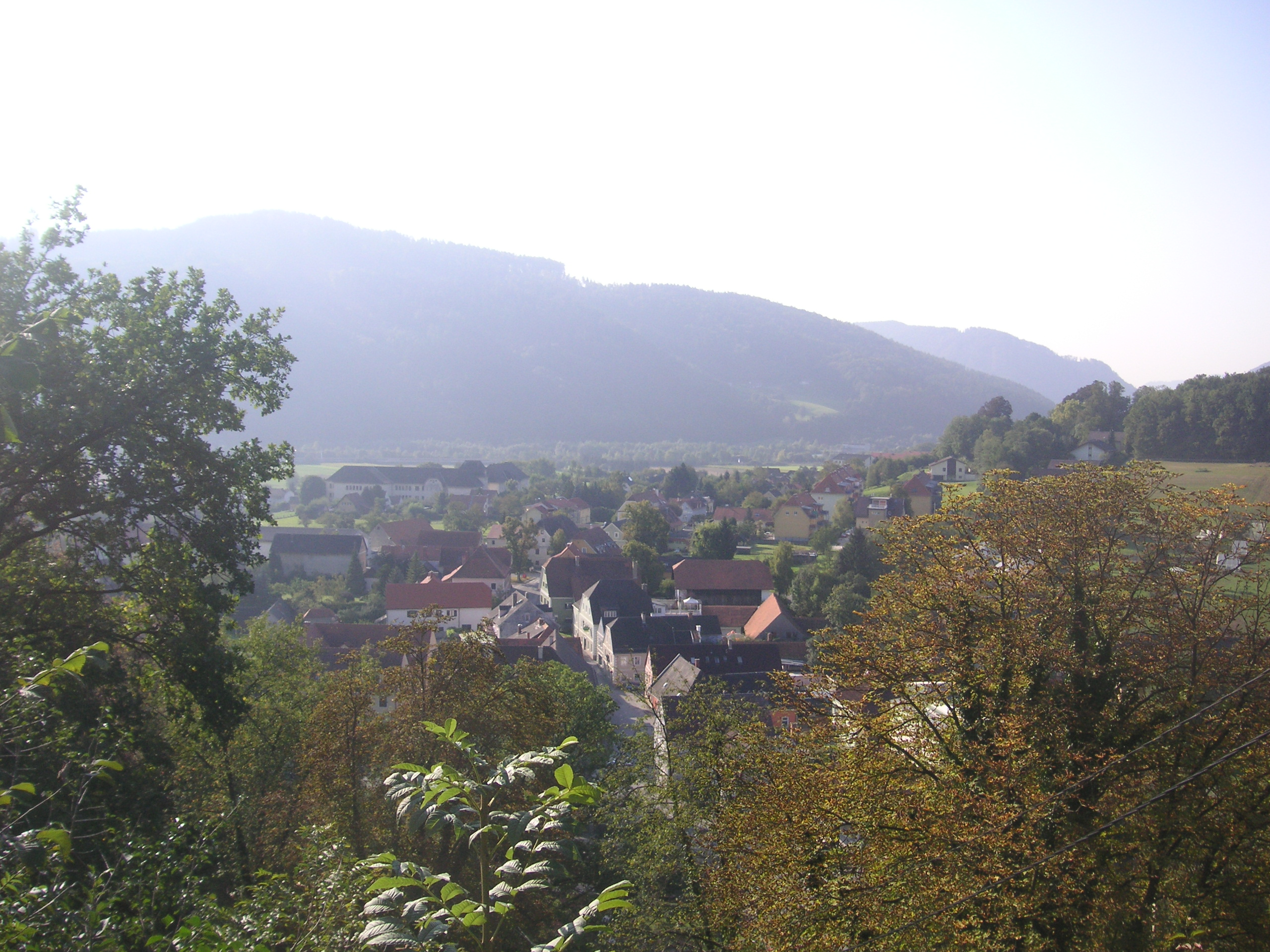
- Deutschfeistritz

- Coat of arms

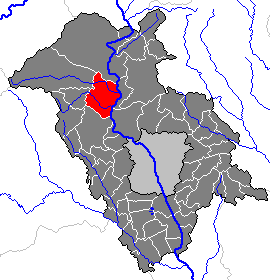
- Location within Graz-Umgebung district

- Location within Austria
- Coordinates: 47°11′55″N 15°20′10″E
- Country: Austria
- State: Styria
- District: Graz-Umgebung

Government
  - Mayor: Michael Viertler (ÖVP)

Area
  - Total: 56.98 km^{2} (22.00 sq mi)
- Elevation: 414 m (1,358 ft)

Population (2018-01-01)
  - Total: 4,311
  - Density: 75.66/km^{2} (196.0/sq mi)
- Time zone: UTC+1 (CET)
  - Summer (DST): UTC+2 (CEST)
- Postal code: 8121
- Area code: 03127
- Vehicle registration: GU
- Website: www.deutschfeistritz.at

Deutschfeistritz (German: [dɔʏtʃˈfaɪstrɪts]) is a municipality in the district of Graz-Umgebung in the Austrian state of Styria. It is the site of Schloss Waldstein, one of the homes of the Princes of Liechtenstein.

== Population ==
Historical population
Year	Pop.	±%
1869	2,335	—
1880	2,420	+3.6%
1890	2,888	+19.3%
1900	2,676	−7.3%
1910	2,736	+2.2%
1923	3,033	+10.9%
1934	3,224	+6.3%
1939	3,163	−1.9%
1951	3,527	+11.5%
1961	3,427	−2.8%
1971	3,822	+11.5%
1981	3,718	−2.7%
1991	3,745	+0.7%
2001	3,843	+2.6%

== Personalities ==
- Vincenz Liechtenstein, Austrian politician, died unexpectedly on 14 January 2008 at his house in Deutschfeistritz.
