= Princess Maria Ana of Braganza =

Maria Ana de Bragança
- Princess Karl August of Thurn and Taxis
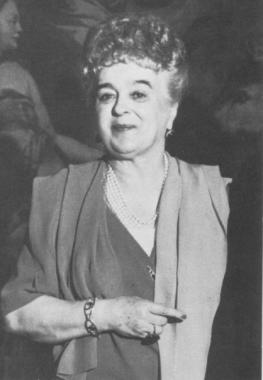
- Born: 3 September 1899; Schloss Fischhorn, Zell am See, Salzburg, Austria-Hungary
- Died: 23 June 1971 (aged 71); Feldafing, Bavaria, Germany
- Burial: Gruftkapelle, Saint Emmeram's Abbey, Regensburg
- Spouse: Prince Karl August of Thurn and Taxis (m. 1921)
- Issue: Princess Clotilde; Princess Mafalda; Johannes, 11th Prince of Thurn and Taxis; Prince Albert
Names
- Portuguese: Maria Ana Rafaela Micaela Gabriela Lourença de Bragança
- House: Braganza
- Father: Miguel Januário, Duke of Braganza
- Mother: Princess Maria Theresa of Löwenstein

Princess Maria Ana of Braganza (Portuguese: Maria Ana Rafaela Micaela Gabriela Lourença de Bragança; 3 September 1899 – 23 June 1971) was a member of the exiled Miguelist branch of the House of Braganza. Through her marriage to Karl August, 10th Prince of Thurn and Taxis, she became a princess of the House of Thurn and Taxis.

== Early life ==
Maria Ana was born on 3 September 1899 at Schloss Fischhorn in Zell am See, Austria-Hungary. She was the fourth daughter of Miguel Januário, Duke of Braganza, the Miguelist pretender to the Portuguese throne, and his second wife Princess Maria Theresa of Löwenstein-Wertheim-Rosenberg.

Her family lived within the Austro-Hungarian Empire due to the Portuguese law of banishment of 1834, which had exiled her grandfather King Miguel I of Portugal after the Liberal Wars. Those Portuguese royalists who recognized her father as the rightful king acknowledged Maria Ana and her sisters as legitimate infantas of Portugal under traditional house customs.

== Marriage and later ==
Styles of Princess Karl August of Thurn and Taxis
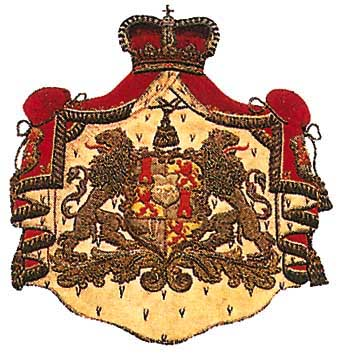
- Reference style: Her Serene Highness
- Spoken style: Your Serene Highness

On 18 August 1921, Princess Maria Ana married Karl August, 10th Prince of Thurn and Taxis at Schloss Taxis in Dischingen, Baden-Württemberg, Germany. He was the third eldest son of Albert, 8th Prince of Thurn and Taxis and Archduchess Margarethe Klementine of Austria. Following the wedding, the couple established their primary residence at Schloss Höfling near Regensburg.

The marriage produced four children:

- Princess Clotilde of Thurn and Taxis (1922–2009), married Prince Hans-Moritz of Liechtenstein in 1944 and had issue, including Prince Gundakar of Liechtenstein.
- Princess Mafalda of Thurn and Taxis (1924–1989).
- Johannes, 11th Prince of Thurn and Taxis (1926–1990), married Countess Gloria von Schönburg-Glauchau in 1980 and had issue.
- Prince Albert of Thurn and Taxis (1930–1935).

Princess Maria Ana died on 23 June 1971 at the age of 71 in Feldafing, Bavaria, Germany.

== Ancestry ==
Ancestors of Princess Maria Ana of Braganza

8. John VI of Portugal
4. Miguel I of Portugal
9. Infanta Carlota Joaquina of Spain
2. Miguel Januário, Duke of Braganza
10. Constantine, Hereditary Prince of Löwenstein
5. Princess Adelaide of Löwenstein
11. Princess Agnes of Hohenlohe-Langenburg
1. Princess Maria Ana of Braganza
12. Constantine, Hereditary Prince of Löwenstein (= 10)
6. Charles, Prince of Löwenstein
13. Princess Agnes of Hohenlohe-Langenburg (= 11)
3. Princess Maria Theresa of Löwenstein
14. Alois II, Prince of Liechtenstein
7. Princess Sophie of Liechtenstein
15. Countess Franziska Kinsky of Wchinitz and Tettau
