= Prince Gundakar of Liechtenstein =

Liechtensteiner prince (born 1949)

Prince Gundakar
- Count of Rietberg
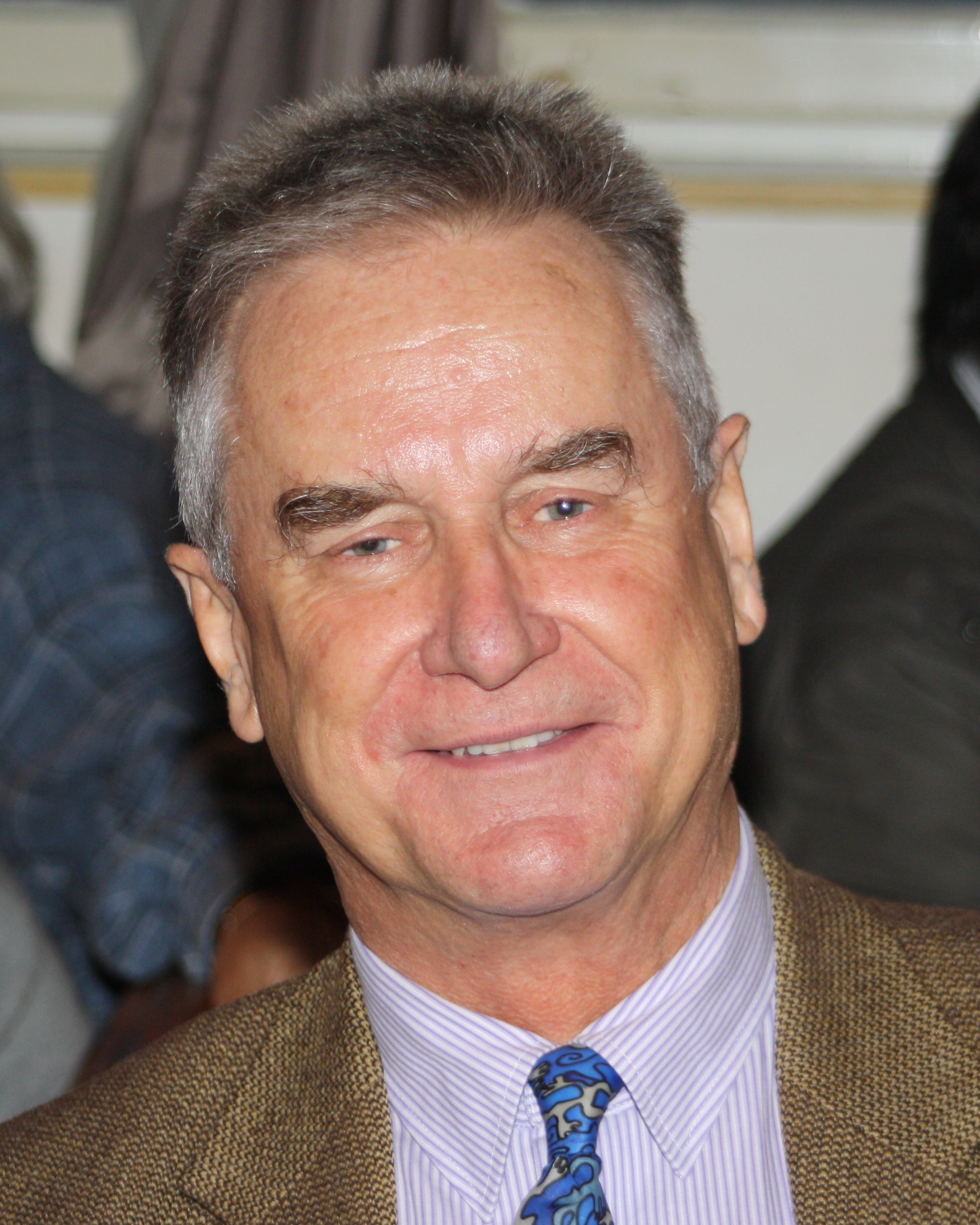
- Prince Gundakar in 2012
- Born: 1 April 1949 (age 77); Vienna, Austria
- Spouse: Princess Marie Isabelle d'Orléans (m. 1989)
- Issue: Princess Leopoldine; Princess Marie Immaculée; Prince Johann; Princess Margarete; Prince Gabriel
Names
- Gundakar Albert Alfred Petrus
- House: Liechtenstein
- Father: Prince Hans-Moritz of Liechtenstein
- Mother: Princess Clotilde von Thurn und Taxis

Prince Gundakar Albert Alfred Petrus of Liechtenstein (born 1 April 1949) is a member of the princely family of Liechtenstein. He is the second child and eldest son of Prince Hans-Moritz of Liechtenstein and Princess Clotilde von Thurn und Taxis.

== Biography ==
Prince Gundakar was born on 1 April 1949 in Vienna to Prince Hans-Moritz of Liechtenstein and Princess Clotilde von Thurn und Taxis. His father was the son of Prince Alfred of Liechtenstein and Princess Theresia zu Oettingen-Oettingen und Oettingen-Wallerstein. His mother was the daughter of Karl August, 10th Prince of Thurn and Taxis and Princess Maria Ana of Braganza.

He is a graduate of the Royal Agricultural College in England, having attended school as a child in Austria. After working six years in a Brazilian bank, he bought extensive farm lands in the Mato Grosso region. Thereafter he proceeded to spend four months a year in Brazil and the remainder in Austria, where he manages his 3500 hectare agricultural estate in Styria.

== Marriage and issue ==
He married civilly in Dreux on 22 July 1989 and religiously in Friedrichshafen on 29 July 1989 Princess Marie Isabelle Marguerite Anne Geneviève d'Orléans (b. Boulogne-sur-Seine, 3 January 1959), daughter of Henri, comte de Paris, duc de France and Duchess Marie Therese of Württemberg, and had issue:

- Princess Léopoldine Eléonore Thérèse Marie of Liechtenstein (b. 27 June 1990, Vienna), her godparents are Prince Eudes, Duke of Angoulême (maternal uncle) and Princess Eleonore of Liechtenstein (paternal aunt). She is godmother to her first cousin Princess Antoinette of Orléans, eldest daughter of the duke and duchess of Vendôme. She married to Bruno Walter Pedrosa João in 14 february 2026 in Estrela Basilica, Lisbon.
- Princess Marie Immaculata Elisabeth Rose Aldegunde of Liechtenstein (b. 15 Dec 1991, Vienna), her godparents are Prince Jean, Duke of Vendôme (maternal uncle) and Princess Aldegunde of Liechtenstein (paternal aunt). She is godmother to her first cousin Princess Jacinthe of Orléans, youngest daughter of the duke and duchess of Vendôme. Married Zurab Dzidziguri (brother of Princess Kristine de Bagration-Mukhrani) in Vienna on 31 October 2026.
- Prince Johann Wenzel Karl Emmeran Bonifatius Maria of Liechtenstein (b. 17 Mar 1993, Vienna), his godparents are Princess Blanche of Orléans (maternal aunt) and Prince Emmeran of Liechtenstein (paternal uncle). He is godfather to his first cousin Prince Joseph of Orléans, younger son of the duke and duchess of Vendôme. Married Countess Felicitas von Hartig (b. 10 Apr 1994) civilly on 30 April 2023 and religiously in Vienna on 10 June 2023. They have a daughter, Princess Josefine (b. 2024).
- Princess Margarete Franciska Daria Wilhelmine Marie of Liechtenstein (b. 10 Jan 1995, Vienna), her godparents are Prince François, Count of Clermont (maternal uncle) and Princess Daria of Thurn und Taxis (father's cousin). She is godmother to her first cousin Princess Louise-Marguerite of Orléans, middle daughter of the duke and duchess of Vendôme.
- Prince Gabriel Karl Bonaventura Alfred Valerian Maria of Liechtenstein (b. 6 May 1998, Vienna), his godparents are Prince Alfred of Liechtenstein and Madame Gilles Lambotte, née Maria-Edla de Rambuteau.

Prince Gundakar of Liechtenstein House of Liechtenstein Born: 1 April 1949
Lines of succession
Preceded by Prince Johannes	Line of succession to the Liechtensteiner throne 34th position	Succeeded by Prince Johann
