= Jeffrey Hyland =

American businessman (died 2022)

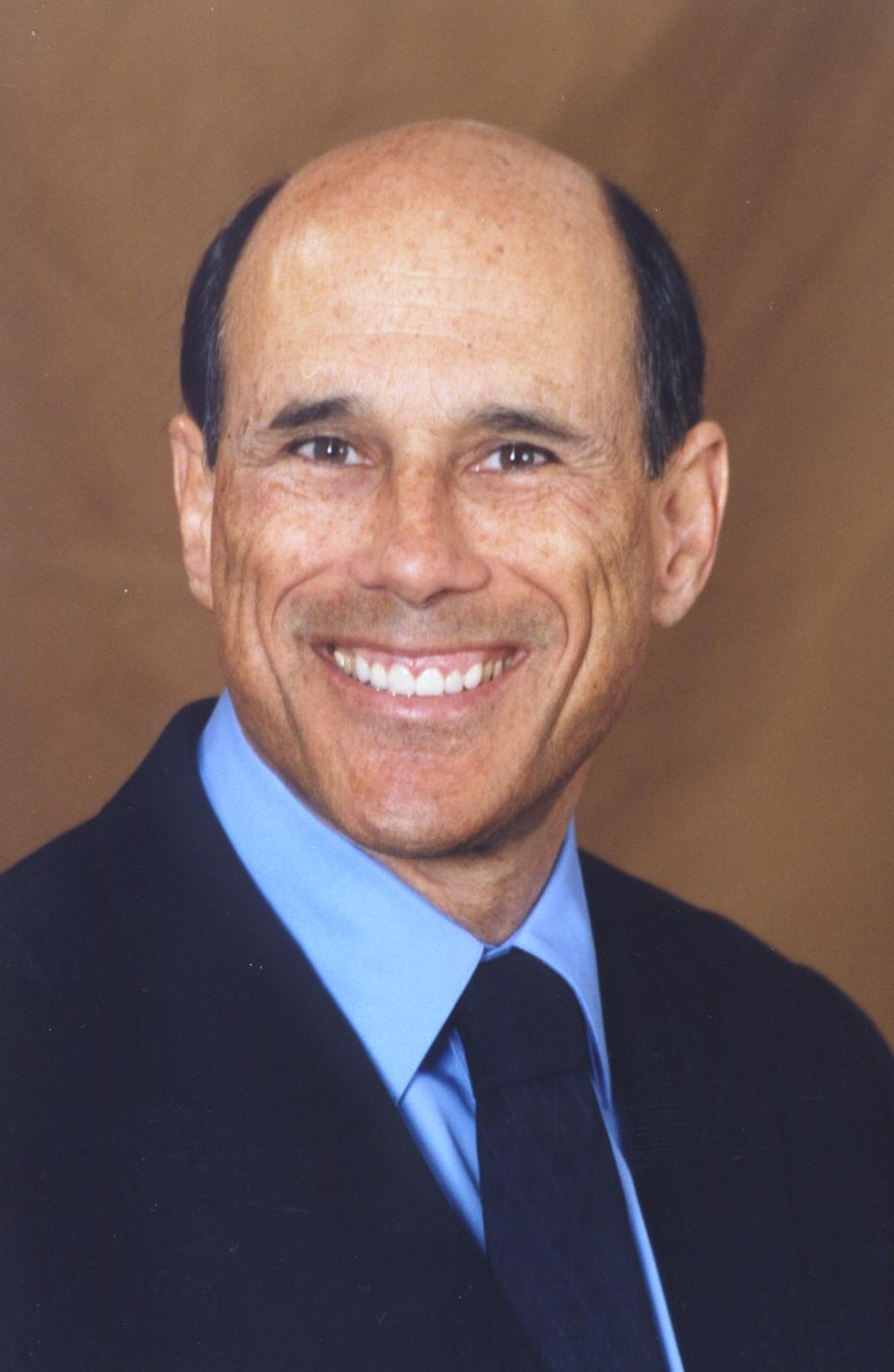
- Born: c. 1946
- Died: February 16, 2022 (aged 75)
- Education: Cornell University, United States International University
- Occupations: President and co-founder of Hilton & Hyland Real Estate,
- Writing career
- Notable work: The Legendary Estates of Beverly Hills
- Website: www.hiltonhyland.com

Jeffrey Jonathon Hyland (c. 1946 – February 16, 2022) was an American real estate businessman, president of Hilton and Hyland, a real estate firm in Beverly Hills, California, and author. He had personally handled several billion dollars in real estate sales.

== Early life ==
Hyland was born and raised in Little Holmby in Los Angeles, California. He attended Cornell University's School of Hotel Administration, but returned to California to surf. He graduated from United States International University in San Diego, California.

== Career ==
He obtained his broker license on 8 January 1975.

During his early years in real estate, he became an architectural historian. He assisted in the publication of Paul Williams, A Legacy of Style by Karen Hudson and David Gebhard and Wallace Neff's The Romance of Regional Architecture. Jeff co-authored The Estates of Beverly Hills (published 1984, republished 1990) and authored the monograph The Legendary Estates of Beverly Hills (Rizzoli).

He was named “The Gatekeeper of Beverly Hills” by Town & Country and has served as President of the Beverly Hills Board of Realtors, President of the Los Angeles County Boards of Real Estate, and State Director for the California Association of Realtors. He recently received the Institute of Classical Architecture and Art's Legacy Award and The Will Rogers Real Estate Lifetime Achievement Award from the City of Beverly Hills.

Hyland broke the record for the highest sale in Los Angeles history in 2019 with the sale of The Manor for $120 million and then broke the record again with the sale of the late Jerry Perenchio's Chartwell Estate for $150 million.

=== Hilton & Hyland ===
In 1993, Jeff Hyland and Rick Hilton co-founded Hilton & Hyland with the original intent of creating a highly personalized real estate firm that today is the highest grossing single office in the world.

Casa Encantada, the most expensive home listing in Los Angeles at $225 million, is currently listed by Hyland.

Former Million Dollar Listing cast member Chad Rogers, Frank Robinson's daughter, Nichelle, Ron Kass's son, Robert, Anne Heche's former husband, Coleman Laffoon, and Richard D. Zanuck's daughter-in-law, Marisa, are among Hilton & Hyland's 106 salespeople.

=== The Legendary Estates of Beverly Hills ===
He is the author of The Legendary Estates of Beverly Hills, a history of 50 estates in Beverly Hills, Holmby Hills, and Bel-Air.

== Personal life and death ==
Hyland was married to Lori Hyland, a painter. He died after a long battle with cancer on February 16, 2022, at the age of 75.
