= Steven M. Hilton =

American philanthropist (born 1950)

- Born: November 9, 1950 (age 75); Santa Monica, California, U.S.
- Education: UCLA Anderson School of Management; University of California, Santa Barbara
- Occupation: Philanthropist
- Predecessor: Donald H. Hubbs
- Successor: Peter Laugharn
- Father: Barron Hilton
- Relatives: Hilton family

Steven Michael Hilton (born November 9, 1950) is an American philanthropist. He is the son of hotel magnate Barron Hilton and the grandson of Conrad Hilton, founder of the Hilton Hotels chain. Hilton is the retired chairman of the Conrad N. Hilton Foundation, a humanitarian charity. He served as president and CEO of the foundation prior to his retirement in 2015.

== Early life, education, and early career ==
Hilton was born in Santa Monica, California, the third of eight children born to Marilyn June (née Hawley) and William Barron Hilton. Barron Hilton, who succeeded his father Conrad Hilton as president and CEO of Hilton Hotels Corporation in 1966, became the family's patriarch after Conrad Hilton's death in 1979. Steven Hilton grew up with his siblings at their family home in Santa Monica, and later in the Holmby Hills section of Los Angeles.

Hilton earned a bachelor's degree in History at the University of California, Santa Barbara in 1974, and prepared to follow his father into the hotel business. He spent five years working in a variety of sales and operations positions at Hilton hotels in Georgia, Alabama and California. He briefly explored the science and economics of aquaculture in California and Hawaii before returning to Southern California in 1983.

== Conrad N. Hilton Foundation ==
Donald H. Hubbs, a longtime business advisor to both Hilton's father and his grandfather, was chairman, president and chief executive officer of the Conrad N. Hilton Foundation. Hubbs offered Hilton a job as an entry-level program assistant. Hilton was soon promoted to program associate, then program officer. In the late '80s, he earned a master's degree from the Anderson School of Management at the University of California, Los Angeles. In 1989, he was put in charge of grant-making as vice president of programs and was elected to the board of directors. The board named him president in 1998, and on Hubbs' retirement in 2005, Hilton succeeded him as CEO as well.

The foundation also introduced the annual Conrad N. Hilton Humanitarian Prize, which is awarded to a nonprofit organization doing extraordinary work to reduce human suffering. The prize shines a spotlight on the charity that helps raise awareness and funding for its work.

Hilton has also been directly involved in the foundation's response to humanitarian crises. He traveled to Haiti in January 2010, just days after the earthquake that killed 220,000 people and injured 330,000 more. The Hilton Foundation immediately provided $500,000 in grants to organizations that provided emergency aid for more than 200,000 survivors. Hilton accompanied aid workers to the devastated capital of Port-au-Prince, and the epicenter in the area of Léogâne 16 miles to the west. Later in the year, the Hilton Foundation provided another $575,000 in grants to three organizations that were helping children severely traumatized by the quake.

Since 2012, the Hilton Foundation has funded relief efforts for the Syrian refugee crisis—the largest population displacement since World War II. In February 2015, Hilton traveled to the Turkish-Syrian border with two of these grantee organizations – Luftfahrt ohne Grenzen (LOG/Wings of Help) and International Medical Corps – to see first-hand the services being provided in partnership with the Turkish Government, the U.N. High Commissioner for Refugees, and other international organizations and local nongovernmental organizations. By March 2015, the foundation had made a total of $1.8 million in grants to organizations serving this displaced population. Hilton authored an op-ed piece published in The Seattle Times calling for increased investment in refugee relief by the international community.

At the end of 2015, Hilton retired as president and CEO of the Foundation while retaining his position as chairman of the board. Prior to Hilton's arrival in 1983, the Conrad N. Hilton Foundation had made a total of $6 million in grants since its formation in 1944. By the time he retired, the foundation had made $1.4 billion in grants.

From 2021 to 2025, he served on the independent international jury to select the winner of the Conrad N. Hilton Humanitarian Prize.

== Personal Life ==
Hilton resides in Malibu, California with his wife, musician Lisa Hilton—the jazz pianist and composer—where they raised their two children. Hilton earned a second-degree black belt in Aikido and practices Taiji Chuan.

In 2025, Hilton and his brother, David, were voted into the Skateboarding Hall of Fame, along with their teammate on the Hobie Vita-Pakt Skateboard Team, George Trafton. The team was formed in 1964 after their father, Barron Hilton, contracted to mass produce the Hobie Super Surfer skateboard designed by watersports pioneer, Hobie Alter. As president of Vita-Pakt citrus products, Barron funded production of Hobie's new skateboard as well as a national media tour with director Bruce Brown who premiered his landmark film, The Endless Summer, around the U.S. That tour generated the initial wave of popularity for the sport of skateboarding.
