= Archduchess Elisabeth of Austria (1922–1993) =

Archduchess of Austria (1922-1993)

Archduchess Elisabeth
- Princess Heinrich of Liechtenstein
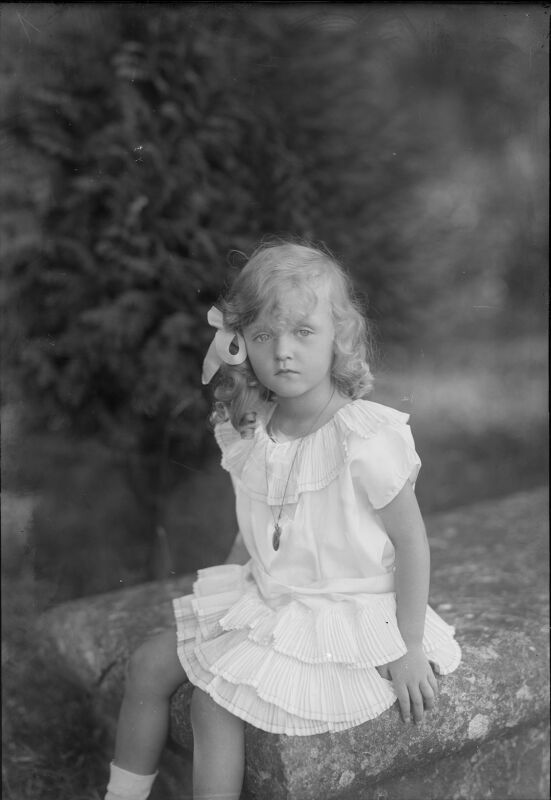
- Elisabeth in 1926
- Born: 31 May 1922; Royal Palace of El Pardo, Madrid, Kingdom of Spain
- Died: 6 January 1993 (aged 70); Waldstein, Bavaria, Germany
- Spouse: Prince Heinrich of Liechtenstein (m. 1949; died 1991)
- Issue: Prince Vincenz; Prince Michael; Princess Charlotte; Prince Christof; Prince Karl
Names
- German: Elizabeth Charlotte Alphonsa Christina Theresia Antonia Josepha Roberta Ottonia Franziska Isabelle Pia Markus d'Aviano Habsburg-Lothringen
- House: Habsburg-Lorraine
- Father: Charles I of Austria
- Mother: Princess Zita of Bourbon-Parma

Archduchess Elisabeth of Austria (31 May 1922 – 6 January 1993) was a member of the House of Habsburg-Lorraine. She was the youngest daughter of Charles I, the last Emperor of Austria, and his wife, Princess Zita of Bourbon-Parma.

== Family and early life ==
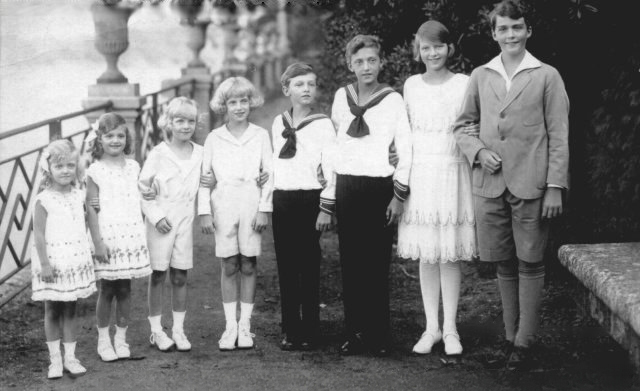
The children of Charles I of Austria and Zita of Bourbon-Parma. From left to right: Elisabeth, Charlotte, Rudolf, Karl Ludwig, Felix, Robert, Adelheid, Otto

Elisabeth was born on 31 May 1922. Her father, Charles I, deposed since 1918, had fallen ill and died from pneumonia on 1 April 1922 two months before she was born. After his death, her pregnant mother Zita was invited by Alfonso XIII of Spain to live in Spain. Zita gave birth to Elisabeth in the Royal Palace of El Pardo in Madrid. She was named after Empress Elisabeth, the wife of Franz Joseph of Austria. Charles had picked the name long in advance, somehow knowing that the baby would be a girl. This new addition to the family had seven older siblings: five brothers (Otto, Robert, Felix, Carl Ludwig, and Rudolf) and two sisters (Adelheid and Charlotte).

By Alfonso's invitation, they took up residence in Palacio Uribarren at Lekeitio in the Bay of Biscay. For the next six years Zita settled in Lekeitio, where she got on with the job of raising and educating her children. Their lessons were under a strict regime, with the greatest volume applying to Otto, and decreasing by age, so that Elisabeth had the smallest workload. Their mother loved to have them all photographed in a line by height, with Otto (the tallest) at one end and Elisabeth (the shortest) at the other end. They lived with strained finances, mainly living on income from private property in Austria, income from a vineyard in Johannisberg, and voluntary collections. Other members of the exiled Habsburg dynasty, however, claimed much of this money, and there were regular petitions for help from former Imperial officials.

In 1929, Elisabeth's family moved to Steenokkerzeel, a small Belgian town near Brussels. As they had close relatives in Belgium, her oldest siblings chose to attend university there. They were forced to flee however in 1940 when German troops invaded Belgium. They narrowly missed being killed by a direct hit on the castle by German bombers and fled to Zita's brother Prince Xavier's French Castle in Bostz. With the assumption of power by the collaborationist government of Philippe Petain, the Habsburgs fled to the Spanish border, reaching it on 18 May. They moved on to Portugal where the U.S. Government granted the family exit visas on 9 July. After a perilous journey they arrived in New York City on 27 July, having family in Long Island and Newark, New Jersey; at one point, Zita and several of her children lived, as long-term house-guests, in Tuxedo Park, at Suffern, New York.

The Austrian imperial refugees eventually settled in Quebec, which had the advantage of being French-speaking (the younger children, including Elisabeth, were not yet fluent in English). She studied at Université Laval. As they were cut off from all European funds, finances were more stretched than ever. At one stage, their mother was reduced to making salad and spinach dishes from dandelion leaves. However, all her brothers were active in the war effort. Otto promoted the dynasty's role in a post-war Europe and met regularly with Franklin Roosevelt; Robert was the Habsburg representative in London; Carl Ludwig and Felix joined the United States Army, serving with several American-raised Austrians of the Mauerer noble clan; Rudolf smuggled himself into Austria in the final days of the war to help organize the resistance.

== Marriage ==
On 12 September 1949, Elisabeth married Prince Heinrich of Liechtenstein in Lignières, France. He was a son of Prince Alfred Roman of Liechtenstein (himself a son of Prince Alfred of Liechtenstein) and Princess Theresia Maria of Oettingen-Oettingen. He was also a cousin of the reigning Franz Joseph II, Prince of Liechtenstein.

They had five children:

| Name | Birth | Death | Notes |
|---|---|---|---|
| Prince Vincenz Karl Alfred Maria Michael of Liechtenstein | Graz, 30 July 1950 | 14 January 2008 | married Hélène de Cossé-Brissac, of the family of the Duke of Brissac; divorced in 1991, had issue. He married in 1999 to Roberta Valeri Manera; without issue. |
| Prince Michael Karl Alfred Maria Felix Moritz of Liechtenstein | Graz, 10 October 1951 | | married in 1986 to Hildegard Berta Peters; had issue. |
| Princess Charlotte Maria Benedikte Eleonore Adelheid of Liechtenstein | Graz, 3 July 1953 | | married in 1979 to Pieter Kenyon Fleming-Voltelyn van der Byl; had issue. |
| Prince Christof Karl Alfred Maria Michael Hugo Ignatius of Liechtenstein | Graz, 11 April 1956 | | unmarried and without issue. |
| Prince Karl Maria Alfred Michael Georg of Liechtenstein | Graz, 31 August 1957 | | unmarried and without issue. |

== Ancestry ==
Ancestors of Archduchess Elisabeth of Austria (1922–1993)

8. Archduke Karl Ludwig of Austria
4. Archduke Otto Franz of Austria
9. Princess Maria Annunziata of Bourbon-Two Sicilies
2. Charles I of Austria
10. George of Saxony
5. Princess Maria Josepha of Saxony
11. Infanta Maria Ana of Portugal
1. Archduchess Elisabeth of Austria
12. Charles III, Duke of Parma
6. Robert I, Duke of Parma
13. Princess Louise of Artois
3. Princess Zita of Bourbon-Parma
14. Miguel I of Portugal
7. Infanta Maria Antónia of Portugal
15. Princess Adelaide of Löwenstein

== Sources ==
- Brook-Shepherd, Gordon (1991). The Last Empress - The Life and Times of Zita of Austria-Hungary 1893-1989. Harper-Collins.
- Brook-Shepherd, Gordon (2004). Uncrowned Emperor: The Life and Times of Otto von Habsburg. Hambledon & London. ISBN 1-85285-439-1.
- Harding, Bertita (1939). Imperial Twilight: The Story of Karl and Zita of Hungary. Bobbs-Merrill Company Publishers. ASIN B000J0DDQO.
