= Barron Hilton =

American hotelier (1927–2019)

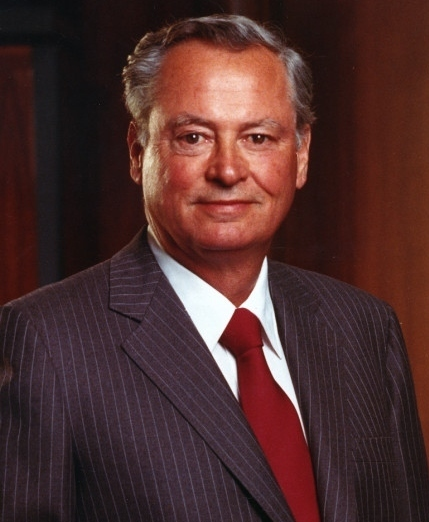
- Hilton in 1986
- Born: William Barron Hilton; October 23, 1927; Dallas, Texas, U.S.
- Died: September 19, 2019 (aged 91); Los Angeles, California, U.S.
- Education: University of Southern California Aeronautical School
- Occupations: Business magnate; philanthropist; sportsman
- Spouse: Marilyn June Hawley (m. 1947; died 2004)
- Children: 8, including Steven and Richard
- Father: Conrad Hilton
- Family: Hilton

Signature
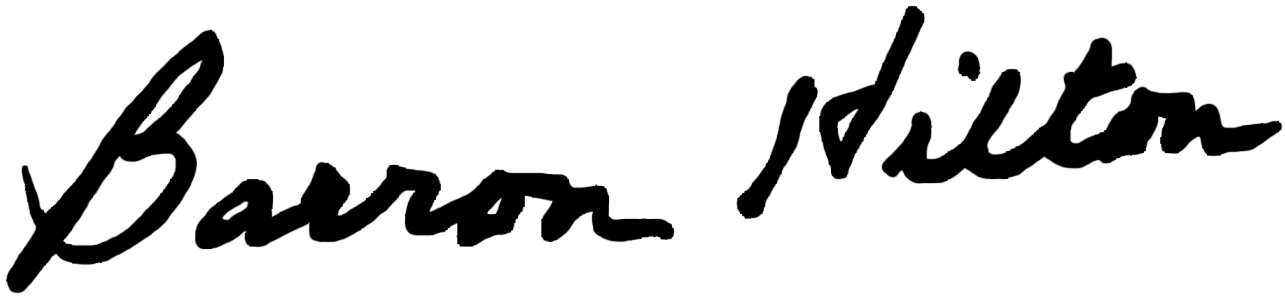

William Barron Hilton (October 23, 1927 – September 19, 2019) was an American business magnate, philanthropist and sportsman. The second son and successor of hotelier Conrad Hilton, he was the chairman, president and chief executive officer of Hilton Hotels Corporation and chairman emeritus of the Conrad N. Hilton Foundation. Hilton, a notable pilot and outdoorsman, was also a founder of the American Football League as the original owner of the Los Angeles Chargers, and helped forge the merger with the National Football League that created the Super Bowl. Like his father before him, he pledged 97 percent of his wealth to the humanitarian work of the Conrad N. Hilton Foundation. At the time, the gift was projected to increase the foundation's endowment from $2.9 billion to $6.3 billion, and will make his estate the organization's most significant donor.

== Early life ==
Hilton was born in Dallas, Texas, to Mary Adelaide (née Barron) and Conrad Nicholson Hilton, founder of Hilton Hotels. Hilton grew up with three siblings, Conrad Nicholson Hilton Jr., Eric Michael Hilton, and Constance Francesca Hilton. His father was of Norwegian and German descent and from New Mexico while his mother was from Kentucky.

He was eight years old when his parents divorced, and he was attending school away from home when his father married actress Zsa Zsa Gabor in 1942. In interviews, Hilton described having “a misspent youth” and said that he had been “kicked out of four or five schools.” He also stated that he was not close to his father during that period, as Conrad Hilton was occupied with expanding his hotel business, which began with a property in Cisco, Texas, in 1919. He did not attend college after finishing school.

He served in the Navy during World War II as a photographer. As a child, Hilton was fascinated by aviation, and learned to fly when he was 17. After his wartime discharge, he attended the University of Southern California Aeronautical School, where he earned his twin-engine rating at age 19.

== Early career and AFL ==
Before joining his father in the hotel industry, Barron Hilton honed his business skills in a variety of entrepreneurial ventures. He acquired the Los Angeles-area distributorship of Vita-Pakt Citrus Products, co-founded MacDonald Oil Company, and founded Air Finance Corporation, one of the nation's first aircraft leasing businesses. In 1954, he was elected vice president of Hilton Hotels, running the company's franchise operations and creating the Carte Blanche credit card as a service to the company's customers.

In 1959, Lamar Hunt offered Hilton the Los Angeles franchise in the new American Football League (AFL). Hilton named his team the Chargers, but denied that he did it to create synergy with his new credit card business. A fan had nominated the name in a contest, and Hilton selected it because of the bugle call and "Charge!" cheer that was often sounded during USC football games at the Los Angeles Memorial Coliseum. The Chargers began playing at the Coliseum in 1960, but in spite of winning the Western Division, the club found it difficult to compete for fans with the Rams of the National Football League (NFL) in their own stadium. Hilton moved the team to San Diego in time for the 1961 season and played in tiny Balboa Stadium, which the city had expanded to 30,000 seats.

Hilton began working with the local newspapers to engender support for construction of a state-of-the-art stadium. Encouraged by San Diego Union sports editor Jack Murphy, among others, a referendum was passed in 1965, and the Chargers began play in the new San Diego Stadium in 1967. With the availability of a new stadium, the city received a baseball expansion franchise from the National League, and the San Diego Padres began play in 1969.

Hilton also served as AFL president in 1965, and helped forge the merger between the AFL and the NFL, announced in 1966, which created the Super Bowl. In all, the Chargers won five divisional titles, and one AFL Championship, during Hilton's six years at the helm of the club. In 1966, directors of Hilton Hotels Corporation asked Hilton to succeed his father as president and chief executive officer of the company, provided that he drop his football responsibilities. He sold his majority interest in the team for $10 million—a record for any professional sports franchise at the time—after an initial investment in a franchise fee of just $25,000.

With the death of the Bills' Ralph Wilson in 2014, Hilton became the last surviving member of the Foolish Club—the nickname the original AFL owners gave each other, as they absorbed the start-up expenses and player salaries necessary to compete with the established NFL.

== Hilton Hotels ==
In 1970, Hilton convinced the Hilton Hotels board to expand into Las Vegas by purchasing the International and the Flamingo from financier Kirk Kerkorian. Hilton Hotels became the first company listed on the New York Stock Exchange to venture into the gaming market. Renamed the Las Vegas Hilton and the Flamingo Hilton, the two resorts tapped a new source of income from gambling. Hilton saw Las Vegas as a leading convention destination and capitalized on the company's strength in that important market segment.

Hilton installed video cameras throughout the casinos to replace the "eye in the sky" system of observers peering through two-way mirrors in the ceiling.

After a decade in the movies, Elvis Presley again began performing in front of live audiences in 1969 at the opening of the International (a few years later renamed the Las Vegas Hilton). He went on to star at the Las Vegas Hilton two months a year—performing two shows a night, seven nights a week—until shortly before his death in 1977. Presley set a world entertainment record at the Las Vegas Hilton for selling out 837 consecutive concerts.

Having played Las Vegas since 1944, Liberace had created the resident entertainer model on the Las Vegas Strip the year before he befriended Elvis at Presley's first foray on the Strip in 1956. Liberace was signed by Hilton to the same showroom as Presley beginning in 1972, for an unprecedented $300,000 per week. He played his last show at the Las Vegas Hilton in 1980, arriving on stage in a classic car, and closing by flying off stage in a 110 lbs. crystal and ostrich feather cape.

The company's expansion into Nevada had an immediate impact on its net income. By 1972, the two resorts contributed 45 percent of the company's income (before interest income, interest expense, write down of investments and sales of properties), nearly matching the income from the other 160 Hilton hotels in the United States.

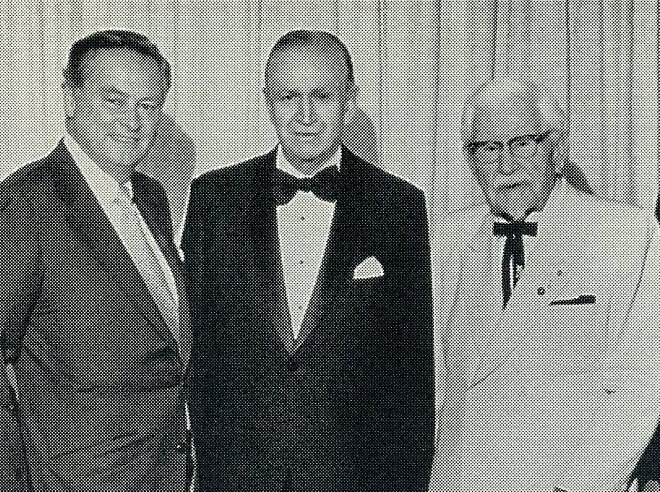
Hilton (left) with J. Willard Marriott and Colonel Sanders in 1979

On the hotel front, in 1975 Hilton sold a 50 percent interest in six of the company's largest hotels to Prudential Insurance Company for $83 million. He took a leaseback to manage the properties, collecting lucrative management fees and a percentage of their gross profits. The sale proved that the hotels were worth double their book value, demonstrating the underlying value of the company's real estate holdings. The transaction also enhanced the value of the stock held by every HHC shareholder. Hilton used the proceeds to pay down high interest debt, and repurchase 20 percent of the company's stock—all at market rate—which was still trading well below the company's book value.

Hilton continued to expand the domestic hotel chain through franchising and the selective acquisition of management contracts and hotels in emerging markets. In 1977, he completed a hotel purchase that his father had initiated 28 years earlier. When Conrad Hilton bought the Waldorf-Astoria in 1949, he actually bought the hotel's operating company and its 30-year lease to run the hotel. The building, and the land under it, were still owned by the realty arm of the Penn Central Railroad. Knowing that the lease would expire in 1979, Hilton deftly negotiated to buy the hotel and real estate from the railroad. The landmark property, whose current value is estimated around $1 billion, was purchased by Hilton for just $35 million.

As competitors aggressively spread across the U.S. in the '80s, Hilton held his own by rehabbing his own hotels and increasing revenues in Las Vegas. Through a series of massive additions to the Flamingo Hilton and the Las Vegas Hilton, the company nearly tripled its rooms in Las Vegas by 1990, from 2,277 to 6,703. He also launched Conrad International in the '80s, and Hilton Garden Inn in the '90s.

Hilton continued as chairman of the board through the next decade as his hand-picked successor, Steve Bollenbach expanded the company through a series of mergers and acquisitions. The advent of friendly capital markets in the late '90s enabled him to acquire such brands as Embassy Suites, DoubleTree, Hampton Inn, Homewood Suites, Bally's and Caesars. Then, in 2005, he reacquired Hilton International, 38 years after it had been sold to TWA. With the company now strategically complete, Bollenbach spun off the gaming business, which merged with Harrah's in 2005 and was renamed Caesars Entertainment.

In 2007, private equity firm The Blackstone Group purchased Hilton Hotels Corporation, consisting of 2,800 hotels with 480,000 rooms in 76 countries and territories. Blackstone paid $47.50 per share, a 32 percent premium over the July 2 closing price. The $26 billion, all-cash transaction included $7.5 billion of debt.

Host Hotels & Resorts veteran Chris Nassetta was hired to manage the company, which was renamed Hilton Worldwide and is now known as Hilton Inc. Now celebrating the 100th year since Conrad Hilton purchased his first hotel, the company has expanded to include 17 brands, 5,800 hotels, and 939,000 rooms in 114 countries of the world.

== Hilton family fortune ==
In 1979, Barron Hilton's father, Conrad Hilton, died at age 91. He left 13.5 million shares of Hilton Hotels Corporation stock—97 percent of his estate—to the Conrad N. Hilton Foundation, a charity that he had established in 1944.

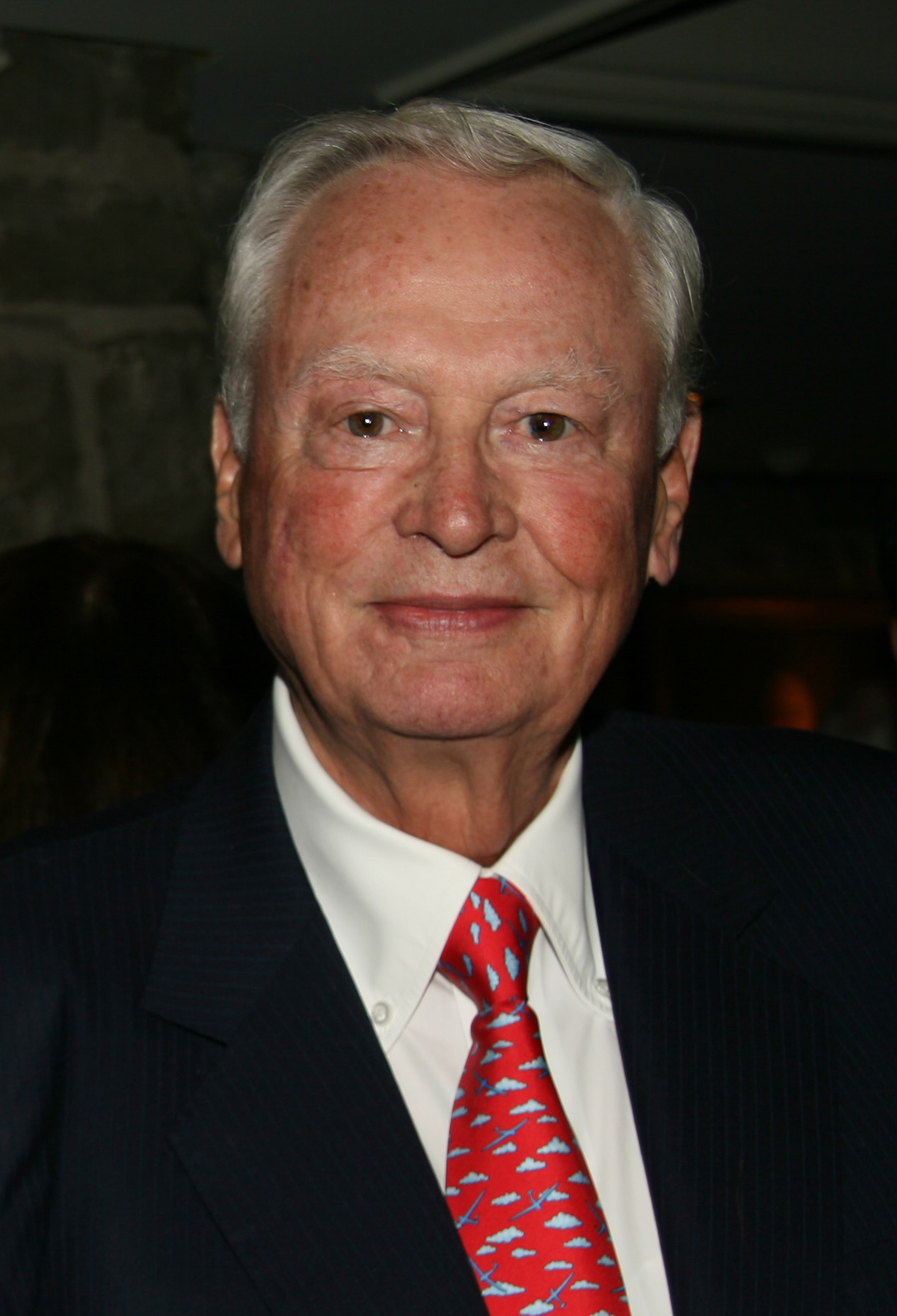
Hilton in 2007

In his will, Conrad also gave Barron the right to purchase those shares in order to maintain family control of the company, but the foundation challenged the option in probate court. It took an entire decade to resolve the issue. Hilton's right to exercise his option was upheld in an appeals court ruling in March 1988, giving him voting power over roughly 34 percent of the company's outstanding shares. Conrad's bequest of stock was worth $160 million when he died in 1979. The shares were worth $654 million when the settlement was reached late in 1988. In a press statement issued after the favorable ruling, Hilton said it gave him "the opportunity to structure an arrangement whereby my father's two objectives, retaining control of the stock in family hands, and benefiting charity through the Conrad N. Hilton Foundation, can both be achieved. I am confident that my father would be pleased with this accord."

The settlement was finalized in 1989. Neither Hilton, nor the foundation, paid for the shares; they split them instead. Hilton received 4 million shares, the Conrad N. Hilton Foundation received 3.5 million shares, and the remaining 6 million shares were placed in the W. Barron Hilton Charitable remainder unitrust, of which Barron was the executor. He received 60 percent of the unitrust income, and the foundation 40 percent, during his lifetime, then the fund would transfer to the foundation.

On December 25, 2007, Hilton announced that he would leave about 97 percent of his estate, estimated at that time to be $2.3 billion, to the Conrad N. Hilton Foundation. Included was an immediate pledge of $1.2 billion, the proceeds of the sale of Hilton Hotels Corporation and Harrah's Entertainment Inc., which was placed in a charitable remainder unitrust that would be transferred to the foundation upon Hilton's death at whatever value the trust was worth at that time. The remainder of the funds that constitute Hilton's pledge of 97 percent of his estate will come from his personal assets, which were estimated at $1.1 billion at the time.

== Conrad N. Hilton Foundation ==
Throughout his career, Conrad Hilton supported a variety of causes, particularly those involving the nuns that had helped educate him in his native New Mexico. He established the Conrad N. Hilton Foundation in 1944, and made a total of $7.6 million of gifts before his death. In his last will and testament, Hilton left general guidance for the use of his endowment.

"There is a natural law, a Divine law, that obliges you and me to relieve the suffering, the distressed and the destitute. Charity is a supreme virtue, and the great channel through which the mercy of God is passed on to mankind. It is the virtue that unites men and inspires their noblest efforts. 'Love one another, for that is the whole law;' so our fellow men deserve to be loved and encouraged—never abandoned to wander alone in poverty and darkness. The practice of charity will bind us—will bind all men in one great brotherhood. As the funds you will expend have come from many places in the world, so let there be no territorial, religious, or color restrictions on your benefactions, but beware of organized, professional charities with high-salaried executives and a heavy ratio of expense. Be ever watchful for the opportunity to shelter little children with the umbrella of your charity; be generous to their schools, their hospitals and their places of worship. For, as they must bear the burdens of our mistakes, so are they in their innocence the repositories of our hopes for the upward progress of humanity. Give aid to their protectors and defenders, the Sisters, who devote their love and life's work for the good of mankind, for they appeal especially to me as being deserving of help from the Foundation."

== Aviation career ==
Hilton was born the year Charles Lindbergh flew the Spirit of St. Louis across the Atlantic. When he was 7 or 8 years old, he rode his bike to Love Field in Dallas to watch the exotic planes of the day take off and land. He promised himself that he would one day learn to fly. He took private flying lessons at a field on the north shore of Oahu during his time in the Navy, and got his pilot's license at age 17.

In addition to his single-engine and multi-engine ratings, Hilton eventually earned glider, lighter than air (balloons) and helicopter ratings as well. He maintained a small fleet of aircraft at his Flying M Ranch east of the sierras in northern Nevada that includes sailplanes, tow planes, aerobatic aircraft, hot air balloons and classic, restored biplanes. He retired from the cockpit in 2012 at age 84.

In the '90s, he backed the first attempts to capture one of the last great milestones in aviation—flying non-stop around the world in a balloon—with the Earthwinds Hilton and Global Hilton campaigns. While falling short of the ultimate goal, Hilton is credited with inspiring the efforts of those who achieved the feat. Bertrand Piccard and Brian Jones were the first to make a trans-global flight in 1999; Steve Fossett became the first to complete the flight solo in 2002.

From 1980 to 2009, he also hosted the Barron Hilton Cup, a unique, worldwide glider competition. Pilots who flew the longest triangular flights during each two-year period in six regions of the world earned participation in a weeklong soaring camp at his Flying M Ranch. Co-founder Helmut Reichmann, Germany's three-time world soaring champion, devised a handicap system that enabled pilots flying older gliders to compete with elite pilots in high-performance aircraft of the latest design. Once at the Flying M, they flew recreationally alongside world champions and celebrities invited to attend by Hilton. Beginning in 1996 with its predecessors, the European Aeronautic Defence and Space Co., EADS, had served as a partner in the event.

Over the years, a number of notable pilots regularly joined Hilton for weekends at the Flying M. They include entertainers John Denver and Cliff Robertson; astronauts Neil Armstrong, Gene Cernan, Bill Anders, and Ulf Merbold; and test pilots and record-holders: Chuck Yeager, Johnny Myers, Clay Lacy, Bruno GanTenbrink, Bob Hoover, Carroll Shelby, Sully Sullenberger, and air, sea and land adventurer, Steve Fossett.

On Labor Day, 2007, Fossett took off from the Flying M Ranch and never returned, perishing in a crash in the Sierras. In spite of an intensive search, the wreckage wasn't discovered until the following spring. The National Transportation Safety Board determined the probable cause(s) of this accident to be "the pilot's inadvertent encounter with downdrafts that exceeded the climb capability of the airplane. Contributing to the accident were the downdrafts, high density altitude, and mountainous terrain." Examination of the airframe and engine revealed no evidence of any malfunctions or failures that would have prevented normal operation.

The Smithsonian National Air and Space Museum honored Hilton in 2010 by christening the Barron Hilton Pioneers of Flight Gallery. The redesigned exhibit recognizes aviators like Lindbergh, Amelia Earhart and the Tuskegee Airmen. The gallery includes an early childhood education component funded by the Hilton Foundation to help youngsters catch the same enthusiasm for aviation that he discovered as a child when Lindbergh and Earhart were making headlines.

In 2012, Hilton was inducted into the International Air & Space Hall of Fame at the San Diego Air & Space Museum.

For his lifelong support of aviation, Hilton received the prestigious FAI Gold Air Medal from the Fédération Aéronautique Internationale in 2009, the same award bestowed upon some of his closest friends and personal heroes, like Yeager, Armstrong, Cernan, Jones, Fossett, and Lindbergh himself.

In 2012, Hilton was also inducted into the International Air & Space Hall of Fame in San Diego, and was hailed as the "patron saint of sport aviation."

== Personal life ==
In 1947, Hilton married Marilyn June Hawley; they remained married until she died in 2004. They had eight children: William Barron Hilton Jr.; Hawley Anne Hilton; Stephen Michael Hilton; David Alan Hilton; Sharon Constance Hilton; Richard Howard Hilton; Daniel Kevin Hilton; and Ronald Jeffrey Hilton; William Barron Hilton Jr. was born in 1948 and Ronald Jeffrey Hilton was born in 1963. Barron Hilton had 15 grandchildren, including Richard Hilton's daughters Paris Hilton and Nicky Hilton Rothschild, and eight great-grandchildren.

His primary residence in Holmby Hills was the Jay Paley House, originally designed in the 1930s for Jay Paley by architect Paul Williams. It was used as the 'Colby mansion' in exterior scenes for The Colbys television series. He also maintained a permanent suite in New York's Waldorf-Astoria.

Hilton and several friends purchased the 475,000-acre Flying-M Ranch in Lyon County, Nevada (the property stretched across the California state line) in the mid-1960s, and he bought the others out in 1972. The ranch included an airport and a two-hole putting green.

Barron Hilton died at his home in Los Angeles on September 19, 2019. He was the last surviving child of Conrad Hilton.

== Other ==
Hilton was a member of a duck club on Venice Island in the Sacramento – San Joaquin River Delta near Stockton in Northern California. Every year he put on a large Fourth of July fireworks display, attracting thousands of boaters to watch it.

== See also ==
- Los Angeles Chargers Hall of Fame

Sporting positions
New creation	Los Angeles/San Diego Chargers principal owner 1959–1966	Succeeded by Gene Klein
