= Gabor sisters =

Trio of Hungarian-American actresses

Gabor sisters

Magda

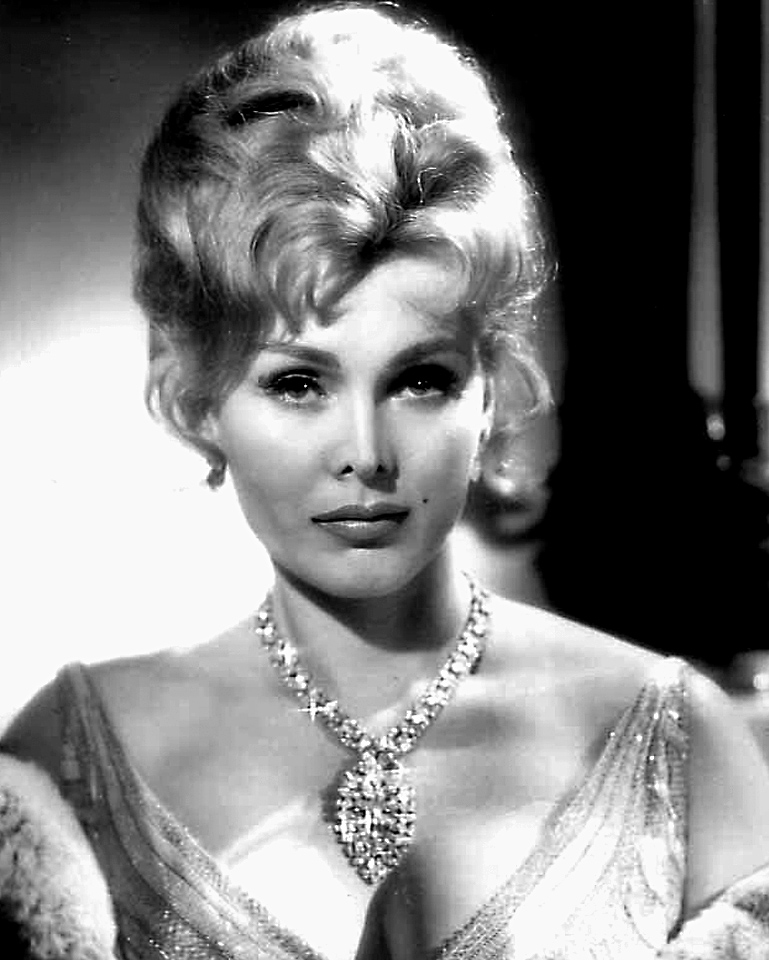
Zsa Zsa

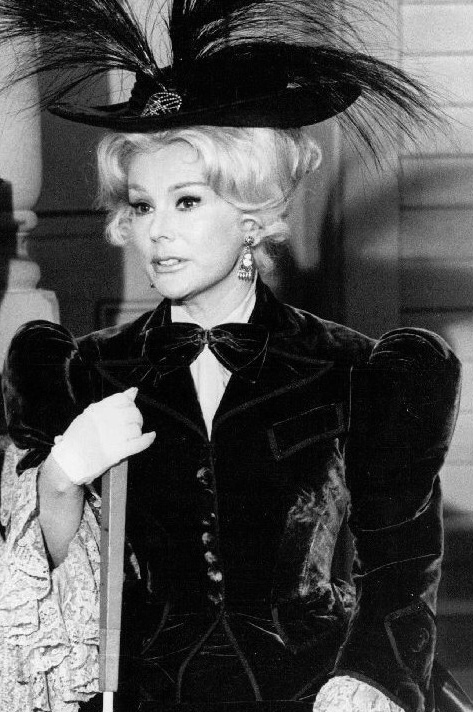
Eva

The Gabor sisters were three Hungarian-American actresses/socialites: Magda (June 11, 1915 – June 6, 1997), Zsa Zsa (February 6, 1917 – December 18, 2016), and Eva (February 11, 1919 – July 4, 1995). Born in Budapest, Hungary, the trio relocated to the United States in hopes of starting film careers.

Outside of their careers, they were each well known for their serial matrimony: Magda was married six times; Zsa Zsa nine times; and Eva five times. British actor George Sanders was first married to Zsa Zsa and later to Magda, though the latter marriage only lasted one month.

== History ==
The Gabor sisters were born into a family of Hungarian-Jewish background, in Budapest, Hungary, to parents Vilmos and Jolie Gabor. The family moved to New York in the wake of World War II. Magda had played a small role in a Hungarian film before the war, so Jolie and her three daughters moved to Hollywood to break into the film business. Eva was the first of the sisters to immigrate to the US, shortly after her first marriage, to a Swedish osteopath, Dr. Eric Drimmer, whom she married in 1937 when she was 18 years old.

In 1953, Eva was given her own television talk show, The Eva Gabor Show, which ran for one season (1953–54). Both of her sisters appeared on the show in guest spots. From September 1965 through April 1971, Eva starred in the CBS sitcom Green Acres, which proved to be a ratings success.

=== Widespread fame ===
The sisters were well-known socialites, with Eva and Zsa Zsa becoming notable for their acting and personality work. Both sisters had recurring roles on hit series such as Climax!, The Love Boat, and The Matinee Theater, at separate times, and appeared as themselves regularly on Hollywood Squares, The Dean Martin Show, and The Merv Griffin Show. In his autobiography, television host Merv Griffin, who was known to spend time with Eva socially, wrote of the Gabor sisters' initial presence in New York and Los Angeles:

All these years later, it's hard to describe the phenomenon of the three glamorous Gabor girls and their ubiquitous mother. They burst onto the society pages and into the gossip columns so suddenly, and with such force, it was as if they'd been dropped out of the sky.

== Deaths ==
The youngest sister, Eva predeceased her elder sisters and her mother. Eva died in Los Angeles on July 4, 1995, from respiratory failure and pneumonia, following a fall in a bathtub in Mexico, where she had been on vacation. Her funeral was held on July 11, 1995, at Good Shepherd Catholic Church in Beverly Hills.

Their mother, Jolie, was apparently never told of Eva's death and died less than two years later, in Palm Springs, California, of natural causes on April 1, 1997, at age 100. The cause of death was declared as kidney failure. Two months after Jolie's death, Magda died on June 6, 1997, aged 81.

Zsa Zsa died at the age of 99 of cardiac arrest while in a coma at Ronald Reagan UCLA Medical Center on December 18, 2016, 50 days shy of becoming a centenarian. The causes of death were given as "Cardiopulmonary arrest, Coronary Artery Disease, and Cerebral Vascular Disease". She had been on life support for the previous five years.

== Sole offspring ==
Zsa Zsa was the only Gabor sister to have a child. Zsa Zsa's daughter with husband Conrad Hilton, Francesca Hilton, was born on March 10, 1947. She died on January 5, 2015, at the age of 67, from an apparent stroke or heart attack. She had no children. Zsa Zsa was reportedly never told of her daughter's death.

== Appearances together ==
Year	Title	Magda	Zsa Zsa	Eva	Notes
1953	All Star Revue	Herself	Herself	Herself	TV series; guest appearance
1953–1954	The Eva Gabor Show	Guest	Guest	Host	Television series
1955	The Colgate Comedy Hour	Herself	Herself	Herself	TV series; guest appearance
1974	V.I.P.-Schaukel	Herself	Herself	Herself	TV series; guest appearance
1975	Arsenic and Old Lace	None	Aunt Abby	Aunt Martha	Play in Chicago, Illinois
1993	Hollywood Woman	None	Herself	Herself	TV series; Episode: "Glitz and Glamour"
2005	Screen Goddess	Herself	Herself	Herself	Documentary

== Bibliography ==
- Brown, Peter H (1985). Such Devoted Sisters: Those Fabulous Gabors. New York, N.Y: St. Martin's Press. ISBN 0-312-77498-2.
- Turtu, Anthony; Reuter, Donald F. (2001). Gaborabilia: An Illustrated Celebration of the Fabulous, Legendary Gabor Sisters. New York, N.Y: Three Rivers Press. ISBN 0-609-80759-5.
