= Magda Gabor =

Hungarian-American socialite and actress (1915–1997)

- Gabor in Bernardine (1954)
- Born: Magdolna Gábor; June 11, 1915; Budapest, Austria-Hungary
- Died: June 6, 1997 (aged 81); Palm Springs, California, U.S.
- Resting place: Desert Memorial Park
- Occupations: Actress; socialite
- Years active: 1937–1991
- Spouses: Jan Bychowski (m. 1937; died 1944) William Rankin (m. 1946; div. 1947) Sidney Robert Warren (m. 1949; div. 1950) Tony Gallucci (m. 1957; died 1967) George Sanders (m. 1970; ann. 1971) Tibor Heltai (m. 1972; div. 1975)
- Mother: Jolie Gabor
- Relatives: Zsa Zsa Gabor (sister); Eva Gabor (sister); Francesca Hilton (niece); Tom Lantos (cousin-in law)

Magdolna Gabor (June 11, 1915 – June 6, 1997) was a Hungarian and American socialite and actress, and the elder sister of Zsa Zsa and Eva Gabor.

== Early life ==
The eldest daughter of a jeweler, Jolie (1896–1997), and a soldier, Vilmos Gábor (1881–1962), she was born in 1915 in Budapest. Her parents were both from Jewish families. She is listed in Hungary: Jewish Names from the Central Zionist Archives, under her first married name, as "Magda Bychowsky".

During World War II, Gabor was reported to have been the fiancée of the Portuguese ambassador to Hungary, Carlos Sampaio Garrido; another source claims she was his mistress and another claims she was his aide. After she fled to Portugal in 1944, following the Nazi occupation of Hungary with Sampaio's assistance, she was reportedly the mistress of a Spanish nobleman, José Luis de Vilallonga. Gabor arrived in the United States in February 1946, from Natal, Brazil. Within a year of her arrival she married an American citizen, William Rankin, and remained in the country.

== Marriages ==
Gabor was married six times. She was widowed twice, divorced three times, and one marriage was annulled. All the unions were childless. Her husbands, in chronological order, were:

- Jan Bychowsky (m. November 19, 1937 – May 22, 1944; his death), a reputed Polish count and RAF pilot. Gabor gave her name as "Magda de Bychowsky" and her marital status as divorced on a February 11, 1946, airline passenger manifest, accessed on ancestry.com, December 30, 2011; according to this form, she had left her city of residence (Lisbon, Portugal), where she lived at 17 Buenos Aires, and arrived in New York City to visit her family.
- William M. Rankin (m. December 3, 1946 – August 11, 1947; divorced) an American playwright and screenwriter (The Harvey Girls, among other films); they divorced in Los Angeles in 1947. He was born on March 31, 1900, and died in March 1966.
- Sidney Robert Warren (m. July 14, 1949 – 1950; divorced) an attorney. They married in Riverhead, Long Island, New York, in 1949, and divorced the following year.
- Arthur "Tony" Gallucci (m. April 1, 1956 – January 22, 1967; his death), president of Samuel Gallucci & Son, "one of the oldest building contracting concerns in the United States". They wed in Franklin, New Jersey. He died of cancer in 1967.
- George Sanders (m. December 5, 1970 – January 6, 1971; annulled) a British actor, who had previously been married to her sister Zsa Zsa. They married in Riverside, California.
- Tibor R. Heltai (m. August 5, 1972 – 1975; divorced) an economic consultant who became a real-estate broker. They married in Southampton, New York, in 1972, separated in June 1973 and divorced two years later in 1975.

== Death ==
Gabor died on June 6, 1997, aged 81. The cause was kidney failure. She was interred next to her mother in Desert Memorial Park in Cathedral City, California.

== Filmography ==
| Year | Title | Notes |
|---|---|---|
| 1937 | Modern Girls | Film |
| 1953 | Four Star Revue | Television |
| 1953–1954 | The Eva Gabor Show | Television |
| 1955 | The Colgate Comedy Hour | Television |

== See also ==
- Gabor sisters
