= Lozzi (surname) =

Lozzi is a surname. Notable people with the surname include:

- Edward Lozzi, American publicist
- Vincent Lozzi (born 1932), American politician
