= Edward Lozzi =

American publicist (1948/1949–2026)

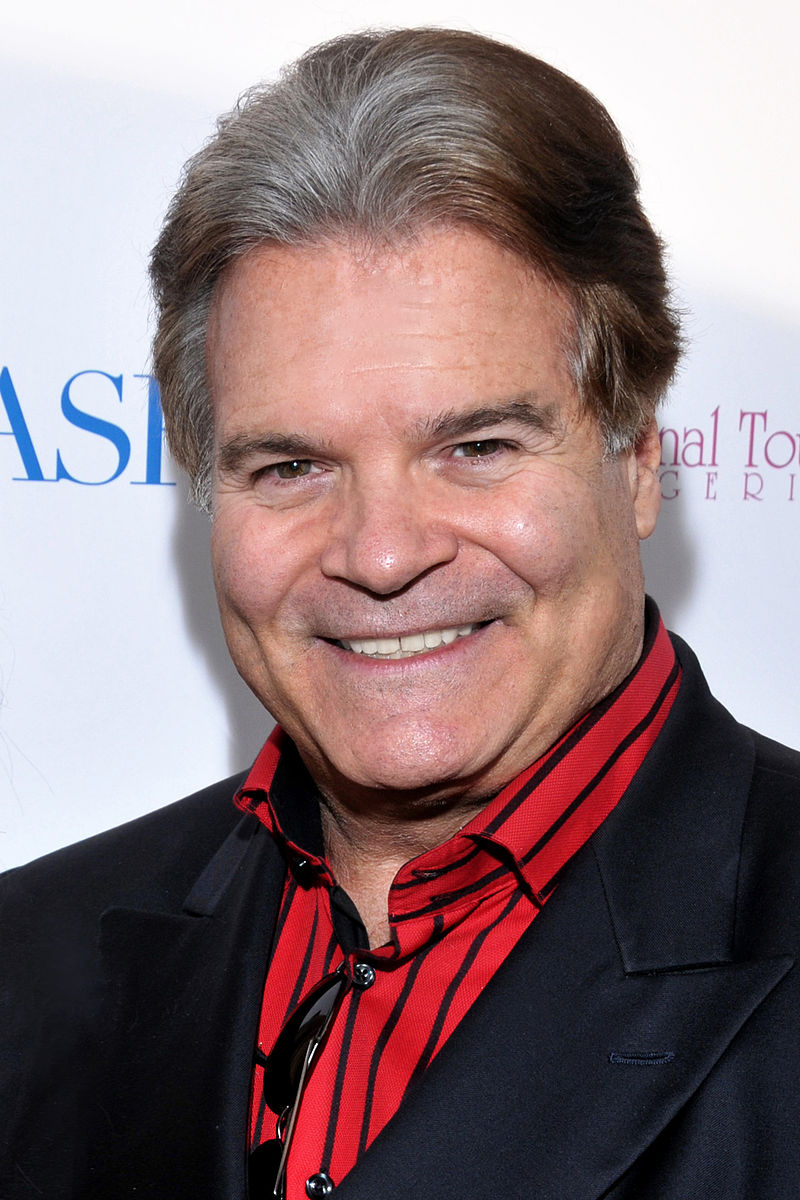
- Lozzi in 2015
- Born: 1948 or 1949; Hawthorne, New Jersey, U.S.
- Died: April 22, 2026 (aged 77)
- Occupations: Publicist, political consultant, White House Press Advance staffer, writer

Edward P. Lozzi (1948 or 1949 – April 22, 2026) was an American publicist, political consultant, White House Press Advance staffer, and writer. He was the founder of a Beverly Hills-based public relations company. He was an occasional contributor to The Huffington Post and an on-air commentator for Fox News and CNN. He was often consulted by media outlets on matters relating to celebrities, high-profile legal cases, political campaigns, book promotion, motion picture/Television publicity, and crisis management.

== Background ==
Lozzi was born in Hawthorne, New Jersey, to young Big Band musician Virgil Lozzi and Elizabeth Ann Rhodes, daughter of New Jersey multiple newspaper magnate Raymond L. Rhodes, founder of the Rhodes Real Estate and Insurance companies and a government official in the Eisenhower administration. Lozzi attended the Delbarton School for Boys and DePaul High School before being recruited to the University of Tennessee NCAA Football team which rose to third in the Nation in 1968. At UT Lozzi majored in Business Administration. In 1967 Lozzi was accepted in the USAF Reserve Officer Training Flight School (DET. 800) at UT in Knoxville Tennessee, where he pursued pre-flight training as a cadet and was chosen for Special Ops. training programs during the Vietnam War period. In 1972, Lozzi was named to Who's Who In American Universities & Colleges. In 1973, after receiving his Bachelor of Business Administration degree, Lozzi was accepted into the Harvard Graduate Business School Executive Education Program at Soldiers Field in Boston, Massachusetts, majoring in Organizational Design and Development. In 1972, Lozzi obtained a position as a Property & Casualty Underwriter at the Hartford Insurance Company on Wall Street in New York City. In 1973, Lozzi joined the Rhodes Agency, Inc, Insurance Brokers in New Jersey, a family-owned multiple-location company where he became Vice President of Advertising & Marketing. In 1975 Lozzi was appointed to a position on the Board of the Alexander Hamilton Savings & Loan Bank in Hawthorne, New Jersey, the youngest executive to ever hold that position at age 25.

Lozzi died after a brief illness on April 22, 2026, at the age of 77.

== Public relations ==
Lozzi founded Edward Lozzi & Associates, a Beverly Hills public relations company, in 1981 after he held positions in sales and editorial for Dow Jones Irwin Publishing-textbook division and an internship at Rogers & Cowan Public Relations. His clients have included Jon Voight, Milton Berle, Larry Hagman, Debbie Reynolds, Lou Ferrigno, George Barris, Buzz Aldrin, Dennis Cole, Bo Hopkons, Mamie Van Doren, Zsa Zsa Gabor, Francesca Hilton Oscar winner Shirley Jones, actors and Academy Award nominated screenwriters Renée Taylor & Joe Bologna, actor Ed Lauter, Director/Producer Stanley Kramer, Tina Louise, Pat Boone, author/illustrator Maurice Sendak, Jeraldine Saunders, author, nationally syndicated Astrologer's column, and creator of The Love Boat Television series, Michael King of King World Entertainment, Peter Nygard-Nygard International and actress Lana Clarkson Lozzi's tribute to his twenty five-year relationship with Lana Clarkson was made public by his guest editorial in the Huffington Post. Clarkson was murdered in 2003 by record producer Phil Spector. Corporate clients have included Chasen's Restaurant and the Academy of Science Fiction, Fantasy & Horror Films' Annual Saturn Awards ceremonies, and famed attorney and founder of the American Trial Lawyers Association- Melvin Belli. During his time as Director of Communications of the national firm of Belli & Belli, Lozzi directed press conferences and legal news press releases for many of the nation's largest and precedent making lawsuits of the 20th century including the first Tobacco litigations, the Dupont silicone breast implant cases, the Norplant Birth control class action suits, the CNN tailgate sexual assault litigations, and the Imelda Marcos and Ferdinand Marcos criminal and civil actions on behalf of thousands of political victims of the Marcos regime.

In 1995, during the O.J. Simpson murder trial in Los Angeles, Lozzi was retained by Al Cowlings, the best friend of OJ and the driver of the infamous white Ford Bronco slow police chase seen live on worldwide TV. At a Press Conference organized by the Lozzi firm for Al Cowlings and his criminal attorney Donald Re, an estimated 100 million viewers tuned in. Lozzi was the publicist for twenty seven years of the annual Night of 100 Stars Oscar Party held in Beverly Hills.

Lozzi provided media services pro-bono to The Survivors Network of Those Abused by Priests, SNAP, the largest clergy sex abuse organization in the world and mainly opposing the Diocese of Los Angeles during the record setting legal settlements in 2006. Only weeks after the 9/11 attack on the World Trade Center in 2001, Lozzi's firm announced in U.S. News & World Report Magazine, that a group of victim Fortune 500 Company CEO's had formed a 'Mercenary Army' to hunt down Osama Bin Laden for the $25 million bounty offered by the U.S. Government. Lozzi appeared on national news shows to explain.

In 2001, Lozzi won the Irwin Award for Book Publicist of the Year. In 2003 Lozzi and his PR company were retained by actor producer Tommy Wiseau to promote the premiere and provide a publicity campaign for The Room, which has become an international cult film classic and showing in theaters ever since. In 2017, the film The Disaster Artist, about the making of The Room starring James Franco as Tommy Wiseau, opened nationally to rave reviews.

In 2011, Lozzi and his firm Edward Lozzi & Associates was awarded the Certificate of Commendation from the City of Los Angeles at a special event where Fifth District City Council-member Paul Koretz saluted him for his "outstanding contributions to society and accomplishments in the entertainment industry...through your steadfast ways and caring deeds, you have helped to further the common goal of making our City a better place in which to live".

== Persis Khambatta's Death and Murder Allegations ==
The official cause of Persis Khambatta's 1998 death in Bombay (now Mumbai), India, was widely reported as a massive heart attack, a claim that was later disputed by her former publicist, the late Edward Lozzi. In a 2021 YouTube livestream interview conducted by Zennie62Media CEO Zennie Abraham, Lozzi—who began representing Khambatta in 1985 and was also her former romantic partner—alleged that she was murdered. According to Lozzi, no autopsy was ever performed and Indian authorities did not issue a formal death certificate.

Lozzi claimed the motive for her alleged murder was strictly political. Khambatta was an avid supporter of former Indian Prime Minister Indira Gandhi, frequently attending campaign rallies with her, and was reportedly preparing to portray Gandhi in a biographical film. Lozzi alleged that this close association caused Khambatta to face severe harassment and death threats from political opponents, including having rocks with warning notes thrown through the windows of her home. Lozzi stated to Abraham that he had dispatched private investigators to India following her death, who concluded she was killed for ignoring these threats.

== Toni Mannix's deathbed confession ==
In 1999 Edward Lozzi testified to have overheard the deathbed confession of Toni Mannix for her involvement in the murder of Superman actor George Reeves. Already in her seventies, the widow of former MGM studio executive Edgar "Eddie" Mannix, struck up a friendship with Lozzi before her 1983 death of Alzheimer's disease. Lozzi, who rented the pool house from Mannix, attended her bedside as a priest took her final confession, and in a 1999 interview with EXTRA, Lozzi revealed her admitted complicity in the death of 1950s TV Superman George Reeves.

== White House media work ==
Between 1990 and 1993, Lozzi served as a White House Press Advance Office aide for the George H. W. Bush Administration. His overall superior was Press Secretary Marlin Fitzwater. In 1999 Lozzi was appointed Press Secretary for the United States Representative to the United Nations General Assembly, Sim Farar, who was appointed by President Bill Clinton and confirmed by the U.S. Senate.
