= Zsa Zsa Gabor =

Hungarian-American socialite and actress (1917–2016)

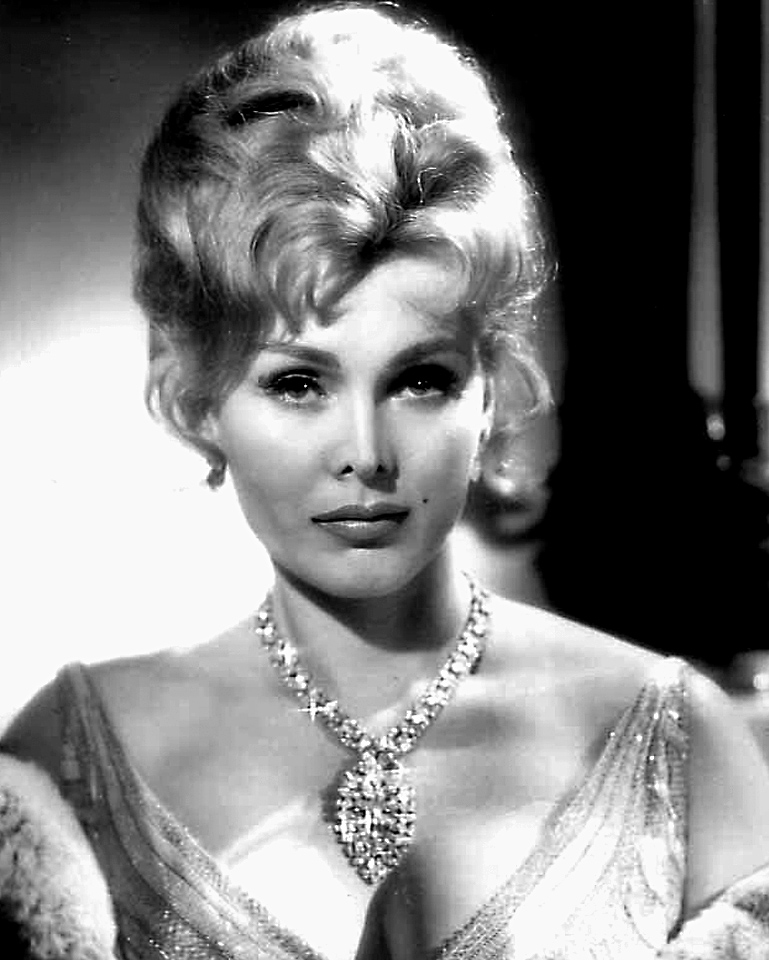
- Gabor in 1959
- Born: Sári Gábor; February 6, 1917; Budapest, Austria-Hungary
- Died: December 18, 2016 (aged 99); Los Angeles, California, U.S.
- Resting place: Kerepesi Cemetery, Budapest
- Citizenship: Hungary; Turkey (1935–1949); United States (from 1949)
- Occupations: Actress; socialite
- Years active: 1933–1998
- Spouses: Burhan Belge (m. 1935; div. 1941) Conrad Hilton (m. 1942; div. 1947) George Sanders (m. 1949; div. 1954) Herbert Hutner (m. 1962; div. 1966) Joshua S. Cosden Jr. (m. 1966; div. 1967) Jack Ryan (m. 1975; div. 1976) Michael O'Hara (m. 1976; div. 1982) Felipe de Alba (m. 1983; ann. 1983) Frédéric Prinz von Anhalt (m. 1986)
- Children: Francesca Hilton
- Mother: Jolie Gabor
- Relatives: Magda Gabor (sister); Eva Gabor (sister)

Zsa Zsa Gabor (Note: /ˌʒɑːʒɑː ˈɡɑːbɔːr, - ɡəˈbɔːr/ ZHAH-zhah GAH-bor, - gə-BOR, Hungarian: [ˈɡaːbor ˈʒɒʒɒ]) (born Sári Gábor; (Note: [ˈɡaːbor ˈʃaːri]) February 6, 1917 – December 18, 2016) was a Hungarian and American socialite and actress. Her sisters were socialite Magda Gabor and actress and businesswoman Eva Gabor.

Gabor competed in the 1933 Miss Hungary pageant, where she placed as second runner-up. She began her stage career in Vienna the following year. Gabor emigrated from Hungary to the United States in 1941 and became a sought-after actress with "European flair and style". Her first film role was a supporting role in Lovely to Look At, released in 1952. The same year, she appeared in We're Not Married! and in her most famous film, Moulin Rouge. Gabor appeared in more than 70 movies, and her acting career continued into the 1990s.

Outside of her career, Gabor was famous for her glamour, her extravagant Hollywood lifestyle, and her series of marriages. Gabor had nine husbands, including hotel magnate Conrad Hilton and actor George Sanders.

== Early life and family ==
Zsa Zsa Gabor was born Sári Gábor on February 6, 1917, (Note: Gabor subtracted as much as 11 years off her birthdate when filling out official documents, including her driver's license and passport applications. Her true age was exposed in November 1989, when former boarding school classmate Elizabeth Nussbaum alerted the press. To fix the chronology of Gabor's pre-fame life, biographer Sam Staggs said he had to conduct "an investigation as vast as that of the Watergate scandal.") in Budapest, Hungary, then part of the Austro-Hungarian Empire. The middle of three daughters, her parents were Jolie (née Janszieka Tillemann, 1896–1997) and Vilmos Gábor (né Grün, 1881–1962). Jolie owned a jewelry shop in Budapest, while Vilmos was a Royal Hungarian Army officer. Her parents were both Jewish.

Gabor was named after Sári Fedák, a Hungarian actress. Gabor was called Zsa Zsa because, as a little girl, she couldn't pronounce her own name.

In 1941, Gabor left Hungary for the United States. During a layover at Eppley Airfield in Omaha, Nebraska en route to Hollywood, she made headlines by telling the Associated Press that she had danced with Adolf Hitler twice. (Note: Providing belated clarification, Gabor told The Washington Post in 1988 that it was actually Josip Broz Tito she danced with, not Hitler. "Somehow, a Yugoslavian communist dictator and a Nazi tyrant occupy the same mental pigeonhole," commented the interviewer, Henry Allen.) On July 8, 1944, aided by Gabor's then-husband, Conrad Hilton, Gabor's parents fled Budapest during the Nazi invasion and occupation of Hungary. (Note: Attributed to multiple citations:) In 1949, she received American citizenship.

Gabor's elder sister, Magda, later became an American socialite and her younger sister, Eva, became an American actress and businesswoman. The Gabor sisters were first cousins of Annette Lantos, wife of California Congressman Tom Lantos (D-CA).

== Career ==
Gabor at Miss Hungary in 1933

In January 1933, following her time as a student at a Swiss boarding school, Gabor placed second runner-up in the fifth Miss Hungary pageant behind Lilly Radó and crown winner Júlia Gál. In 1934, she began her acting career in Vienna. On August 31, 1934, she sang the soubrette role in Richard Tauber's operetta, Der singende Traum (The Singing Dream), at the Theater an der Wien in Vienna. This was her first stage appearance.

After emigrating to the United States, Gabor became a sought-after actress with "European flair and style".

In 1944, Gabor co-wrote a novel with writer Victoria Wolf entitled Every Man For Herself. According to Gabor, the fictional story was derived, in small part, from Gabor's life experiences. The book was bought by an American magazine, Ladies' Home Journal. In 1949, Gabor declined an offer to play the leading role in a film version of the classic book Lady Chatterley's Lover. According to the Cedar Rapids Gazette, she turned down the role of Lady Chatterley due to the story's controversial theme.

Gabor's film credits include Moulin Rouge (her most famous film), Lovely to Look At, and We're Not Married!, all from 1952, and 1953's Lili. In 1958, she ran the gamut of moviemaking, from Touch of Evil to the camp oddity Queen of Outer Space. Later, she appeared in such films as Won Ton Ton, the Dog Who Saved Hollywood (1976) and Frankenstein's Great Aunt Tillie (1984).

She did cameos for A Nightmare on Elm Street 3: Dream Warriors (1987), The Beverly Hillbillies (1993), and A Very Brady Sequel (1996), as well as voicing a character in the animated Happily Ever After (1989). John Huston, who directed Gabor in Moulin Rouge, later described her as a "creditable" actress. Gabor appeared in more than 70 movies, and her acting career continued into the 1990s.

She was a regular guest on television shows, appearing with Milton Berle, Jack Paar, Johnny Carson, Howard Stern, David Frost, Arsenio Hall, Phil Donahue, and Joan Rivers. She was a guest on the Bob Hope specials, the Dean Martin Roasts, Hollywood Squares, Rowan & Martin's Laugh-In, and It's Garry Shandling's Show.

In 1968, she appeared in the role of Minerva on an episode of Batman, becoming the show's final "special guest villain" before it was cancelled. In 1973, she was the guest roastee on The Dean Martin Celebrity Roast. She appeared on Late Night with David Letterman in 1987, where she told host David Letterman about her blind date with Henry Kissinger, which was arranged by Richard Nixon.

== Image ==
Gabor was a socialite known for her glamour, her series of marriages, and her Hollywood extravagance.

Author Gerold Frank, who wrote Zsa Zsa Gabor: My Story Written for Me in 1960, described his impressions of her:

Zsa Zsa is unique. She's a woman from the court of Louis XV who has somehow managed to live in the 20th century, undamaged by the PTA ... She says she wants to be all the Pompadours and Du Barrys of history rolled into one, but she also says, "I always goof. I pay all my own bills. ... I want to choose the man. I do not permit men to choose me."

In his autobiography, television host Merv Griffin wrote of the Gabor sisters' arrival in New York and Hollywood:

All these years later, it's hard to describe the phenomenon of the three glamorous Gabor girls and their ubiquitous mother. They burst onto the society pages and into the gossip columns so suddenly, and with such force, it was as if they'd been dropped out of the sky.

In 1998, film historian Neal Gabler called her kind of celebrity "The Zsa Zsa Factor".

== Personal life ==
Gabor was married nine times. She was divorced seven times, and one marriage was annulled. She wrote the following in her autobiography:

All in all – I love being married ... I love the companionship, I love cooking for a man (simple things like chicken soup and my special Dracula's goulash from Hungary), and spending all my time with a man. Of course I love being in love – but it is marriage that really fulfills me. But not in every case.

Gabor also said, "Men have always liked me and I have always liked men. But I like a mannish man, a man who knows how to talk to and treat a woman—not just a man with muscles."

Her husbands, in chronological order, were:

1. Burhan Belge (May 17, 1935 – December 4, 1941; divorced)
2. Conrad Hilton (April 10, 1942 – October 28, 1947; divorced)
  "Conrad's decision to change my name from Zsa Zsa to Georgia symbolized everything my marriage to him would eventually become. My Hungarian roots were to be ripped out and my background ignored. ... I soon discovered that my marriage to Conrad meant the end of my freedom. My own needs were completely ignored: I belonged to Conrad."
3. George Sanders (April 2, 1949 – April 2, 1954; divorced)
4. Herbert Hutner (November 5, 1962 – March 3, 1966; divorced)
  "Herbert took away my will to work. With his kindness and generosity, he almost annihilated my drive. I have always been the kind of woman who could never be satisfied by money – only excitement and achievement."
5. Joshua S. Cosden Jr. (March 9, 1966 – October 18, 1967; divorced)
6. Jack Ryan (January 21, 1975 – August 24, 1976; divorced)
7. Michael O'Hara (August 27, 1976 – November 30, 1982; divorced)
8. Felipe de Alba (April 13–14, 1983; annulled)
9. Frédéric Prinz von Anhalt (August 14, 1986 – December 18, 2016; her death)

Gabor's divorces inspired her to make numerous quotable puns and innuendos about her marital and extramarital history. She commented: "I am a marvelous housekeeper: every time I leave a man I keep his house." When asked how many husbands she had, she used to say: "You mean other than my own?". Gabor dated German composer Willy Schmidt-Gentner, and Dominican diplomat Porfirio Rubirosa. She also claimed to have had sexual encounters with her stepson Nicky and with the first Turkish president, Mustafa Kemal Atatürk.

In 1973, Gabor purchased a nearly 9,000-square-foot Hollywood Regency-style home in Bel Air. It was originally built for Howard Hughes in 1955 and featured a copper French style roof.

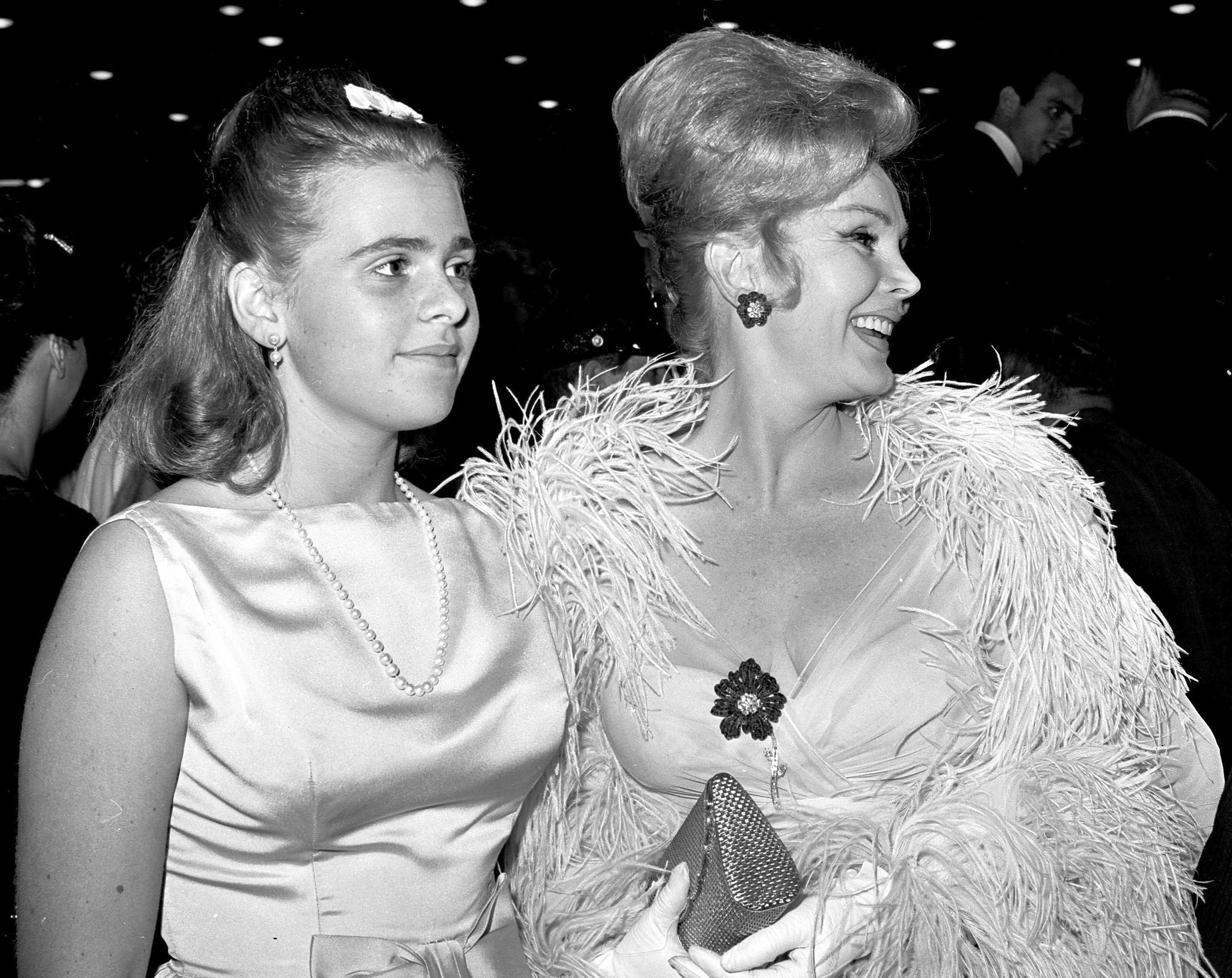
Gabor and Francesca Hilton at the premiere of Cleopatra in 1963.

Gabor's only child, daughter Constance Francesca Hilton, was born on March 10, 1947. According to Gabor's 1991 autobiography, One Lifetime Is Not Enough, her pregnancy resulted from rape by then-husband Conrad Hilton. She was the only Gabor sister who had a child.

In 2005, a lawsuit was filed accusing Constance of larceny and fraud. She allegedly forged her mother's signature to get a US$2 million loan by using her mother's Bel Air house as collateral. The Los Angeles County Superior Court, Santa Monica, threw out the case due to Gabor's failure to appear in court, or to sign an affidavit that she indeed was a co-plaintiff on the original lawsuit filed by her husband, Frédéric von Anhalt. Francesca Hilton died in 2015 at the age of 67 from a stroke. Out of concern for Gabor's physical and emotional state, Frédéric Prinz von Anhalt never told her about her daughter's death.

Gabor and her last husband, Frédéric Prinz von Anhalt, adopted at least ten adult men who paid them a fee of up to $2 million to legally become descendants of Princess Marie-Auguste of Anhalt. Prinz von Anhalt had himself paid Marie-Auguste to adopt him when he was 36 years old.

While Gabor's parents were Jewish, she was a practising Catholic.

=== Legal and financial difficulties ===
On June 14, 1989, in Beverly Hills, California, Gabor was accused of slapping the face of Beverly Hills police officer Paul Kramer when he stopped her for a traffic violation at 8551 Olympic Boulevard. At trial three months later, a jury convicted her of slapping Kramer. They also found her guilty of driving without a license and possessing an open container of alcohol—a flask of Jack Daniel's—in her $215,000 Rolls-Royce, but acquitted her of the charge of disobeying Kramer when she drove away from the traffic stop.

On October 25, 1989, Beverly Hills Municipal Judge Charles G. Rubin sentenced Gabor to serve three days in jail, to pay fines and restitution totaling $12,937, to perform 120 hours of community service, and to undergo a psychiatric evaluation. On June 14, 1990, Gabor dropped her conviction appeal and agreed to serve her sentence. She refused to take part in community service and served three days in jail in the town of El Segundo from July 27 to 30, 1990.

Gabor had a long-running feud with German-born actress Elke Sommer beginning in 1984 when both appeared on Circus of the Stars, and escalating into a multimillion-dollar libel suit by 1993. The suit resulted in an order for Gabor and her husband to pay Sommer $3.3 million in general and punitive damages.

=== Later life and health ===
On November 27, 2002, Gabor was a front seat passenger in an automobile crash on Sunset Boulevard, Los Angeles, from which she remained partially paralyzed and reliant on a wheelchair for mobility. She survived strokes in 2005 and 2007 and underwent surgeries. In 2010, she fractured her hip and underwent a successful hip replacement.

In August 2010, Gabor was admitted to Ronald Reagan UCLA Medical Center in serious condition and received last rites from a Catholic priest, but survived.

In 2011, Gabor's right leg was amputated above the knee to save her life from an infection. In 2011, she was hospitalized again for a number of emergencies, and fell into a coma.

On February 8, 2016, aged 99, Gabor was rushed to hospital after suffering from breathing difficulties. She was diagnosed with a feeding tube–related lung infection and was scheduled to undergo surgery to have her feeding tube removed.

In April 2016, it was reported that Prinz von Anhalt was arranging to move with Gabor to Hungary in time for her 100th birthday in 2017, in accordance with her wishes that she return to Hungary and spend the rest of her life there.

== Death ==
While in a coma, Gabor died from cardiac arrest at Ronald Reagan UCLA Medical Center in Los Angeles, California on December 18, 2016, at the age of 99. On her death certificate, coronary artery disease and cerebrovascular disease are listed as contributing causes. She had been on life support for the previous five years.

Gabor's funeral was held on December 30 in a Catholic ceremony at the Church of the Good Shepherd in Beverly Hills. Approximately 100 mourners attended. Her ashes, placed in a gold rectangular box, were interred at the Westwood Village Memorial Park Cemetery. In July 2021, Prinz von Anhalt had her ashes reinterred in the artists' section of Kerepesi Cemetery in Budapest in order to fulfill her wish to return to Hungary. He said that the remains had been transported in their own first-class airline seat.

== Filmography ==
=== Film ===
Year	Film	Director	Role	Notes	Ref.
1952	Lovely to Look At	Mervyn LeRoy	Zsa Zsa		
1952	We're Not Married!	Edmund Goulding	Eve Melrose		
1952	Moulin Rouge	John Huston	Jane Avril		
1952	The Million Dollar Nickel	Peter Ballbusch			
1953	The Story of Three Loves	Vincente Minnelli and Gottfried Reinhardt	Flirt at bar		
1953	Lili	Charles Walters	Rosalie		
1953	L'ennemi public no. 1 (The Most Wanted Man)	Henri Verneuil	Lola la Blonde		
1954	Sangre y luces (Love in a Hot Climate)	Georges Rouquier and Ricardo Muñoz Suay	Marilena		
1954	Ball of Nations	Karl Ritter	Vera van Loon		
1954	3 Ring Circus	Joseph Pevney	Saadia		
1956	Death of a Scoundrel	Charles Martin	Mrs. Ryan		
1957	The Girl in the Kremlin	Russell Birdwell	Lili Grisenko / Greta Grisenko		
1958	The Man Who Wouldn't Talk	Herbert Wilcox	Eve Trent		
1958	Country Music Holiday	Alvin Ganzer	Herself		
1958	Touch of Evil	Orson Welles	Strip-club owner		
1958	Queen of Outer Space	Edward Bernds	Talleah		
1959	For the First Time	Rudolph Maté	Gloria de Vadnuz		
1960	La Contessa azzurra (The Blue Countess)	Claudio Gora	Loreley		
1960	Pepe	George Sidney	Herself		
1962	Lykke og krone	Colbjørn Helander and Stein Sælen			
1962	The Road to Hong Kong	Norman Panama		Cameo appearance	
1962	Boys' Night Out	Michael Gordon	Boss's girl friend		
1966	Picture Mommy Dead	Bert I. Gordon	Jessica Flagmore Shelley		
1966	Drop Dead Darling	Ken Hughes	Gigi		
1967	Jack of Diamonds	Don Taylor	Herself		
1972	Up the Front	Bob Kellett	Mata Hari		
1976	Won Ton Ton, the Dog Who Saved Hollywood	Michael Winner	Premiere Female Star	Cameo appearance	
1978	Every Girl Should Have One	Robert Hyatt	Olivia Wayne		
1984	Frankenstein's Great Aunt Tillie	Myron J. Gold	Clara		
1987	A Nightmare on Elm Street 3: Dream Warriors	Chuck Russell	Herself	Cameo appearance	
1987	Johann Strauß: Der König ohne Krone (Johann Strauss: The King Without a Crown)	Franz Antel	Aunt Amalie		
1989	Happily Ever After	John Howley	Blossom (voice)		
1991	The People vs Zsa Zsa Gabor		Herself	Documentary	
1991	The Naked Gun 2 ^{1}/_{2}: The Smell of Fear	David Zucker		Cameo appearance	
1992	The Naked Truth	Nico Mastorakis			
1993	Est & Quest: Les Paradis Perdus (East & West: Paradises Lost)	Rival			
1993	The Beverly Hillbillies	Penelope Spheeris	Herself	Cameo appearance	
1996	A Very Brady Sequel	Arlene Sanford		Cameo appearance	

=== Television ===
Year	Series	Role	Notes	Ref.
1953	I've Got A Secret	Guest	January 8, 1953	
1953–1960	What's My Line?	Mystery guest	Recurring role (4 episodes)	
1953–1964	Jukebox Jury	Musical Judge	Recurring role (3 episodes)	
1955	The Red Skelton Show	Movie Star	Episode: "Cookie and Zsa Zsa Gabor"	
1955	Climax!	Mme Florizel, Princess Stephanie	Episodes: "A Man of Taste", "The Great Impersonation"	
1955	December Bride	Herself	Episode: "The Zsa Zsa Gabor Show"	
1950–1956	The Milton Berle Show	Herself	Recurring role (3 episodes)	
1956	Sneak Preview		Episode: "Just Plain Folks"	
1956	The Ford Television Theatre	Dara Szabo	Episode: "Autumn Fever"	
1956–1961	General Electric Theater	Various	Recurring role (5 episodes)	
1956–1958	Matinee Theatre	Various	Recurring role (3 episodes)	
1957–1960	The Arthur Murray Party	Herself	Recurring role (4 episodes)	
1957	The Life of Riley	Gigi	Episode: "Foreign Intrigue"	
1957	Playhouse 90	Erika Segnitz, Marita Lorenz	Recurring role (2 episodes)	
1957	The Pat Boone Chevy Showroom	Herself		
1958	Shower of Stars	Herself	March 20, 1958	
1959	Lux Video Theatre	Helen		
1959	The Dinah Shore Chevy Show	Herself	Recurring guest (2 episodes)	
1960	Ninotchka	Herself	Television film	
1960	Make Room for Daddy	Lisa Laslow	Episode: "Kathy and the Glamour Girl"	
1962	Mister Ed	Herself	Episode: "Zsa Zsa"	
1962–1977	The Merv Griffin Show	Herself	Recurring guest (42 episodes)	
1963–1980	The Mike Douglas Show	Herself	Recurring guest (31 episodes)	
1963	The Dick Powell Show	Girl		
1963–1964	Burke's Law	Anna, the Maid	Recurring role (2 episodes)	
1964	The Joey Bishop Show	Herself	Episode: "Zsa Zsa Redecorates the Nursery"	
1965	Bob Hope Presents the Chrysler Theatre	Pilot	Episode: "Double Jeopardy"	
1965	Gilligan's Island	Erika Tiffany Smith	Episode: "Erika Tiffany-Smith to the Rescue"	
1966	Alice in Wonderland...	The Queen of Hearts (voice)	Television special	
1966	The Rounders	Ilona Hobson	Episode: "The Scavenger Hunt"	
1966	F Troop	Marika	Episode: "Play, Gypsy, Play"	
1966–1975	Hollywood Squares	Herself	Recurring guest (64 episodes)	
1967	Bonanza	Madame Marova	Episode: "Maestro Hoss"	
1968	My Three Sons	Herself	Episode: "Ernie and Zsa Zsa"	
1968	Rowan & Martin's Laugh-In	Herself	Recurring role (8 episodes)	
1968	The Name of the Game	Mira Retzyk	Episode: "Fear of High Places"	
1968	Batman	Minerva	Recurring role (2 episodes)	
1969	Bracken's World	Herself	Episode: "King David"	
1971	Mooch Goes to Hollywood	Narrator	Television film	
1971	Night Gallery	Mrs. Moore	Episode: "The Messiah on Mott Street/The Painted Mirror"	
1974–1976	Dinah!	Self	Recurring role (10 episodes)	
1976	Let's Make a Deal	Home Viewer		
1977	Hollywood Connection	Self	Recurring role (8 episodes)	
1977	3 Girls 3	Self	Episode: "Pilot"	
1979	Supertrain	Audrey	Episode: "A Very Formal Heist"	
1980	The Love Boat	Annette	Episode: "She Stole His Heart/Return of the Captain's Brother/Swag and Mag"	
1980	Hollywood, ich komme	Stargast	Television film	
1981	The Facts of Life	Countess Calvet	Episode: "Bought and Sold"	
1981	As the World Turns	Lydia Marlowe	Series regular	
1983	Matt Houston	Zizi	Episode: "The Purrfect Crime"	
1983	California Girls	Herself	Television film	
1986	Charlie Barnett's Terms of Enrollment	"Star Hungry" Celebrity	Television special	
1986–1989	The New Hollywood Squares	Panelist	Recurring role (12 episodes)	
1988	Pee-wee's Playhouse Christmas Special	Princess Zsa Zsa	Television film	
1989	It's Garry Shandling's Show	Goddess of Commitment	Episode: "It's Garry and Angelica's Show: Part 1"	
1989	The Munsters Today	Herself	Episode: "Threehundredsomething"	
1989	This Is Your Life	Herself	Tribute	
1990	City	Babette Croquette	Episode: "Oil and Water"	
1991	The Fresh Prince of Bel-Air	Sonya Lamor	Episode: "Hi-Ho Silver"	
1994	Late Show with David Letterman	Herself	Sketch	
1994	Ricki Lake	Herself	Expert	
1995	Tattooed Teenage Alien Fighters from Beverly Hills	Herself	Episode "The Glitch"	

=== Theatre ===
Year	Title	Role	Notes	Ref.
1934	Der singende Traum		Theater an der Wien	
1961–1970	Blithe Spirit	Elvira		
1968–1970	Forty Carats	Ann Stanley	Broadway; 780 performances	
1975	Arsenic and Old Lace	Aunt Abby Brewster	Arlington Heights, Illinois	
1993	Cinderella	Fairy Godmother	UCLA	

== Honors ==
=== Golden Globes ===
- 1958 – Special Achievement Award

=== Hollywood Walk of Fame ===
- 1960 – Star on the Walk of Fame for achievements in the television industry.

=== Los Angeles Area Emmy Awards ===
- 1952 – Nomination in the category Most Outstanding Female Personality

== See also ==
- Gabor sisters
