= Jolie Gabor =

Hungarian-American jeweler and socialite (1896–1997)

- Countess de Szigethy
- Born: Janka Tilleman; September 30, 1896; Budapest, Austria-Hungary
- Died: April 1, 1997 (aged 100); Palm Springs, California, U.S.
- Buried: Desert Memorial Park
- Spouses: Vilmos Gábor (m. 1914; div. 1939) Howard Peter Christman (m. 1947; div. 1948) Count Odon Szigethy (m. 1957; died 1989)
- Children: Magda; Zsa Zsa; Eva
- Occupation: Jeweler, businesswoman, socialite, writer

Jolie Gabor, Countess de Szigethy (born Janka Tilleman; September 30, 1896 – April 1, 1997) was a Hungarian-born American jeweler and socialite, and the mother of actresses and fellow socialites Magda, Zsa Zsa and Eva Gabor.

== Family ==
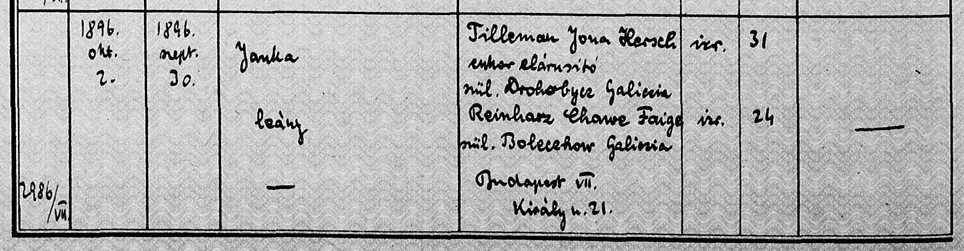
Birth Record for Janka Tilleman

Gabor was born Janka Tilleman on September 30, 1896, in Budapest, Austria-Hungary. Her parents were Jona (or Jónás) Hersch Tilleman (son of Schie Tilleman and Scheindel Grossman) and Chawe Feige (later Franceska) Tilleman (née Reinharz, Reinharcz, or Reinhartz; daughter of Eiseg Reinharz and Dorottya Stein); both of Jolie's parents were of Galician Jewish ancestry (Galicia was then part of the Austrian Empire, later Poland and then Ukraine). The Tillemans were jewelers who owned a jewellery shop known as "The Diamond House". Her father changed his forenames to József. The Tilleman family's Jewish descent was also cited by a surgeon, Dr. Laszlo Tauber, also Jewish and a friend and neighbor of the Gabors in Budapest.

The Reinharz family of Gabor's mother had established jewelry shops in Vienna; her mother's uncle helped the Tillemans open their jewelry business, "The Diamond House", located at Rákóczi utca 54. in Budapest. Franceska (Josef Tilleman's widow), briefly married a medical doctor and general physician, Dr. Miksa Kende (né Kohn), son of Mór Lipót Kohn and Resi Kohn.

Gabor was the aunt of Annette Tilleman (b. 1931), daughter of Jolie's brother Sebestyén Tilleman, and wife of Hungarian-American U.S. Representative Tom Lantos (né Lantos Tamás Péter, in Budapest), the first, and to date only, Holocaust survivor to serve in either house of the United States Congress. Szebasztian Tilleman (or Tillemann as his branch of the family style themselves) and his mother, the Tilleman matriarch Franceska, were killed during an apparent Allied bombing raid on Budapest in 1944.

Addressing her birth forename, usually reserved for Hungarian males, Gabor stated, "My parents were so eager to have a son they named me Jancsi, which translated comes out Little John or Johnny". Her birth certificate, however, indicates her birth name was "Janka". Although born in 1896, Gabor claimed to have been born in 1900, once jokingly stating that she had lied so much about her age she did not remember her actual birth date. Her obituary in The New York Times gave a birth year of 1900. On a ship's passenger manifest dated December 30, 1945, Gabor gave her age as 45 years and two months, which would make her year of birth 1900. Her birth certificate, however, confirms her birth year to be 1896. Author Dominick Dunne stated, in 1995, that Gabor was believed to be 109, which would mean a birth year of approximately 1886. A 1900 year of birth, however, would have made her 13 at the time of her first marriage.

The 1987 edition of Biographical Dictionary, cites Jolie Gabor's complete birthdate to be September 29, 1896, as does the 1959 International Celebrity Register.

== Career ==
In the 1930s, Gabor opened Crystello, a shop selling crystal and porcelain in Budapest, as well as Jolie's, a handmade-costume-jewelry shop at 4 Kígyó utca in Budapest; she also established another branch of that shop in Győr. Eventually there were five such shops in the Budapest area. The firm's jewels also incorporated semiprecious stones and were admired for their old-fashioned settings and workmanship.

"Just like Bulgari is known in Rome, that's how well-known I was in Budapest", Jolie once stated. "Jolie's did so well that at holiday time they were standing outside in line waiting until somebody goes out from the inside." The rise of Nazism in Germany forced her to curtail her retail business, Gabor recalled, "Everybody told, 'Jolie is crazy to go now to Berlin and Leipzig for jewelry.' I never went again."

She was forced to close the stores when Hungary was occupied by the Germans, at which time she and other family members fled to Portugal. They were assisted by Carlos Sampaio Garrido, Portuguese ambassador to Hungary — Gabor's daughter Magda reportedly was either his aide or his mistress — who provided safe passage to many Hungarian Jews in 1944. An article in Vanity Fair stated in 2001 that it was under Sampaio's guidance that the family "... had been spirited out of the country ..." Her brother, Sebestyén (or Sebastian), also a jeweler, spent part of the war in labor camps, beginning in 1942, until he and their widowed mother, Franceska, were later killed in a Budapest bombing raid.

Gabor arrived in the United States on December 30, 1945, aged 49. She opened a successful costume jewelry business (called simply Jolie Gabor) in New York City in 1946, with $7,200 borrowed from her daughters. It later moved to 699 Madison Avenue. Gabor also established a branch of the firm in Palm Springs, California. Among the company's designers were Elsa Beck and Stephen Kelen d'Oxylion, as well as her own daughter, Magda. One of the saleswomen was Evangelia Callas, mother of future opera diva Maria Callas. In 1953 the store introduced ornamental metal fingernails studded with rhinestones.

In 1975, almost 80 years old, Jolie signed with the Keene Lecture Bureau as an inspirational speaker. She toured the country speaking about the relationship between beauty and female empowerment.

== Publications ==
Gabor lent her name to two books:

- Jolie Gabor (Mason Charton, 1975), an as-told-to memoir co-written by Cindy Adams, a newspaper columnist and family friend. Gabor approached Adams to write the book in 1972, even though Gabor fretted that her daughters would dislike the publication. "I am sure it will be a Hungarian tragedy when they read what I have said", she told Adams. "My husband will throw me out and my daughters won't speak to me." Regarding the book, Gabor told another reporter, "Always [a woman] can do something. She makes a new hairdo, she makes a new make-up. If the nose isn't good, she fixes it. That is why I write the book. It's never too late for a new look, a new business, a new husband or lover. When we think life is over, it's always ready to begin".
- Jolie Gabor's Family Cookbook (Thomas Y. Crowell, 1962), which was written with Jean and Ted Kaufman, and contains more than 300 traditional Eastern European recipes.

She is also described, in league with her three very famous daughters and her influence upon them, by Darwin Porter in his award-winning biography, Those Glamorous Gabors, Bombshells from Budapest (Blood Moon Productions, 2013).

== Television appearances ==
In 1957, Jolie Gabor appeared as a mystery guest on the show What's My Line? In 1950, Gabor made a cameo as a jeweler in Black Jack. In 1955, Gabor appeared in The Colgate Comedy Hour. In 1960, Gabor appeared in The Mike Wallace Interview.

== Marriages ==
Gabor was married three times:

- Vilmos Gábor (b. 1875 or 1876 (Note: A&E Networks' April 2000 Biography episode, entitled The Gabors, stated Vilmos was "twenty years [Jolie's] senior.") – d. July 7, 1962), a Hungarian army officer, who achieved the rank of colonel; they married on September 13, 1914, and divorced in 1939. He was the father of her three children: Magda (b. 1915), Zsa Zsa (b. 1917), and Eva Gabor (b. 1919).
- Howard Peter Christman (b. May 22, 1894 – d. March 1986; a.k.a. Peter Howard Christman (Note: Christman's 1917 WWI draft card gives his birth name as Howard Peter Christman.)), a New York City restaurant manager; they married in 1947 and divorced in 1948.
- Count Odon Szigethy (b. July 12, 1912 – d. September 30, 1989; a.k.a. Odon Szigethi, Edmond de Szigethy (Note: Szigethy is sometimes referred to as Count Edmond de Szigethy, but his title has not been established.)), a Hungarian refugee; they married in New York City, New York, on March 3, 1957. She wore a gown by Romanian-American fashion designer, Livia Sylva. "He's a moneymaker," Gabor said, in a 1976 interview, of Szigethy, "He takes care of me; he takes care of my business, my three homes in Florida, New York, and Connecticut. When I marry him, darling, he looks younger than me, but now, he looks older."

== Death ==
Gabor was preceded in death by her youngest daughter, Eva, although she apparently was never told of Eva's death. She died less than two years later, in Palm Springs, California, of natural causes on April 1, 1997, at age 100. Two months after Jolie's death, her eldest daughter, Magda, died. Zsa Zsa died on December 18, 2016, aged 99. Jolie had one grandchild, Francesca Hilton (Zsa Zsa's daughter), who died in 2015. Zsa Zsa was reportedly never told about Hilton's death.

Gabor de Szigethy is buried in Desert Memorial Park, Cathedral City, California.

== Bibliography ==
- Jolie Gabor, by Jolie Gabor as told to Cindy Adams, Mason Charter, 1975; ISBN 0-88405-125-0; ISBN 978-0-88405-125-1
- Jolie Gabor's Family Cookbook, by Jolie Gabor, with Ted & Jean Kaufman, Thomas Y. Crowell Company, 1962.
- Gaborabilia, by Anthony Turtu and Donald F. Reuter, Three Rivers Press, 2001; ISBN 0-609-80759-5
