= Eva Gabor =

Hungarian-American actress and socialite (1919–1995)

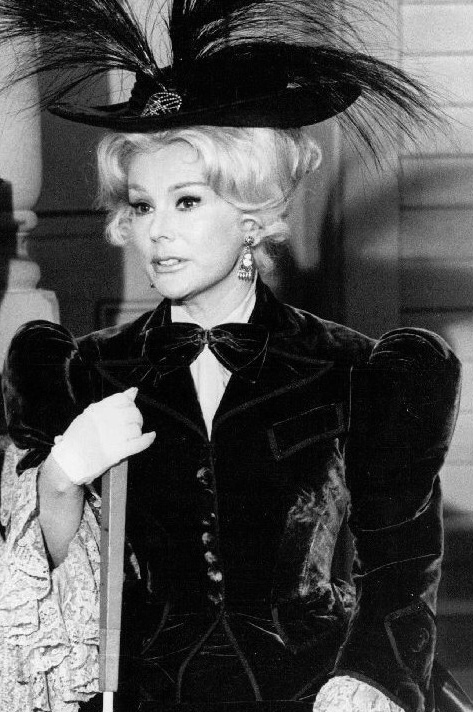
- Gabor on the set of Green Acres in 1969
- Born: Éva Gábor; February 11, 1919; Budapest, Hungary
- Died: July 4, 1995 (aged 76); Los Angeles, California, U.S.
- Burial place: Westwood Village Memorial Park Cemetery
- Occupations: Actress; singer; socialite
- Years active: 1941–1994
- Known for: Green Acres
- Spouses: Eric Valdemar Drimmer (m. 1937; div. 1942) Charles Isaacs (m. 1943; div. 1949) John Elbert Williams (m. 1956; div. 1957) Richard Brown (m. 1959; div. 1973) Frank Gard Jameson Sr. (m. 1973; div. 1983)
- Mother: Jolie Gabor
- Relatives: Magda Gabor (sister); Zsa Zsa Gabor (sister); Francesca Hilton (niece); Tom Lantos (cousin-in-law)

Eva Gabor (/ˌeɪvə ɡəˈbɔːr, - ˈɡɑːbɔːr/ AY-və gə-BOR, - GAH-bor; February 11, 1919 – July 4, 1995) was a Hungarian-born American actress and socialite. She gained fame for her role on the 1965–1971 television sitcom Green Acres as Lisa Douglas, the wife of Eddie Albert's character Oliver Wendell Douglas, and also was known for her voice roles for animated Disney films in the 1970s, including Duchess in The Aristocats (1970) and Miss Bianca in The Rescuers (1977) and its sequel The Rescuers Down Under (1990). In addition to acting, she was also a businesswoman who marketed wigs, clothing, and beauty products. Her elder sisters, Zsa Zsa and Magda Gabor, were also actresses and socialites.

== Early life ==
Gabor was born in Budapest, Hungary, the youngest of three daughters of Vilmos Gábor, a soldier, and his wife, trained jeweler Jolie (born Janka Tilleman). Her parents were both from Hungarian Jewish families. She was the first of the sisters to immigrate to the U.S., shortly after her first marriage to a Swedish osteopath, Eric Drimmer, whom she married in 1937 when she was 18 years old.

== Early career ==
Her first movie role was in the U.S. in 1941's Forced Landing at Paramount Pictures. During the 1950s, she appeared in several feature films, including The Last Time I Saw Paris, starring Elizabeth Taylor; and Artists and Models, which featured Dean Martin and Jerry Lewis. These roles were bit parts. In 1953, she was given her own television talk show, The Eva Gabor Show, which ran for one season (1953–54). Through the rest of the 1950s and early 1960s she appeared on television and in movies. She appeared in one episode of the mystery series Justice and was on the game show What's My Line? as the "mystery challenger." Her film appearances during this era included a remake of My Man Godfrey, Gigi, and It Started with a Kiss.

== Green Acres ==
In 1965, Gabor got the role of Lisa Douglas, whose attorney husband Oliver Wendell Douglas (Eddie Albert) decides to leave the "rat race" of city life. He buys a farm in a rural community, forcing Lisa to leave her beloved big-city urban life. The Paul Henning sitcom Green Acres aired on CBS. Green Acres was set in Hooterville, the same backdrop for Petticoat Junction (1963–70), and would occasionally cross over with its sister sitcom. Despite proving to be a ratings hit, staying in the top 20 for its first four seasons, Green Acres, along with another sister show, The Beverly Hillbillies, was cancelled in 1971 in the CBS network's "rural purge" — a policy to get rid of the network's rural-based television shows.

In 1966, Eva Gabor and Johnny Carson played Twister on The Tonight Show Starring Johnny Carson.

== Later career ==
In 1972, Gabor launched her eponymous fashion collection with Luis Estévez, a Cuban-born American fashion designer.

Gabor later did voice-over work for Disney movies, providing the European-accented voices of Duchess in The Aristocats, and Miss Bianca in The Rescuers and The Rescuers Down Under, as well as the Queen of Time in the Sanrio film Nutcracker Fantasy. She was a panelist on the Gene Rayburn-hosted Match Game. From 1983 to 1984, she was on the Match Game-Hollywood Squares Hour starring Gene Rayburn and Jon Bauman.

Eva appeared as Aunt Renee in the fourth season of Hart to Hart, and in 1983, she reunited with Eddie Albert on Broadway as the Grand Duchess Olga Katrina in You Can't Take It with You. In 1990, she attempted a TV series comeback in the CBS sitcom pilot Close Encounters; the pilot aired as a special that summer, but did not make it to series status. She toured post-communist Hungary after a 40-year absence on an episode of Lifestyles of the Rich and Famous.

== Personal life ==
Eva Gabor was married five times. She had no biological children:

- Eric Valdemar Drimmer, a Swedish-born masseur turned osteopath and psychologist. They wed in London on June 3, 1937, and divorced in Los Angeles, on February 25, 1942 (the divorce was finalized on March 6); Gabor claimed cruelty, saying, "I wanted to have babies and lead a simple family life but my husband objected to me having children".
- Charles Isaacs, an American investment broker. They married on September 27, 1943, and divorced on April 2, 1949.
- John Elbert Williams, a plastic surgeon. They married on April 8, 1956, and divorced on March 20, 1957.
- Richard Brown, a textile manufacturer, who later became a writer and director. They married at the Flamingo Hotel in Las Vegas, Nevada, on October 4, 1959, and divorced in Santa Monica, California, in June 1973.
- Frank Gard Jameson Sr., an aerospace executive and former vice president of Rockwell International. They married in the Vivian Webb Chapel of The Webb Schools, Claremont, California on September 21, 1973. Gabor became stepmother to Jameson's four children. The couple, however, divorced in 1983.

Gabor also had a long term on-and-off affair with actor Glenn Ford, which began during the filming of Don't Go Near the Water in 1957. They dated between their marriages and almost married in the early 1970s.

After her final marriage, Gabor was involved in a relationship with TV producer Merv Griffin until her death. Reuters reported that this was a platonic relationship to hide Griffin's suspected homosexuality.

== Death ==
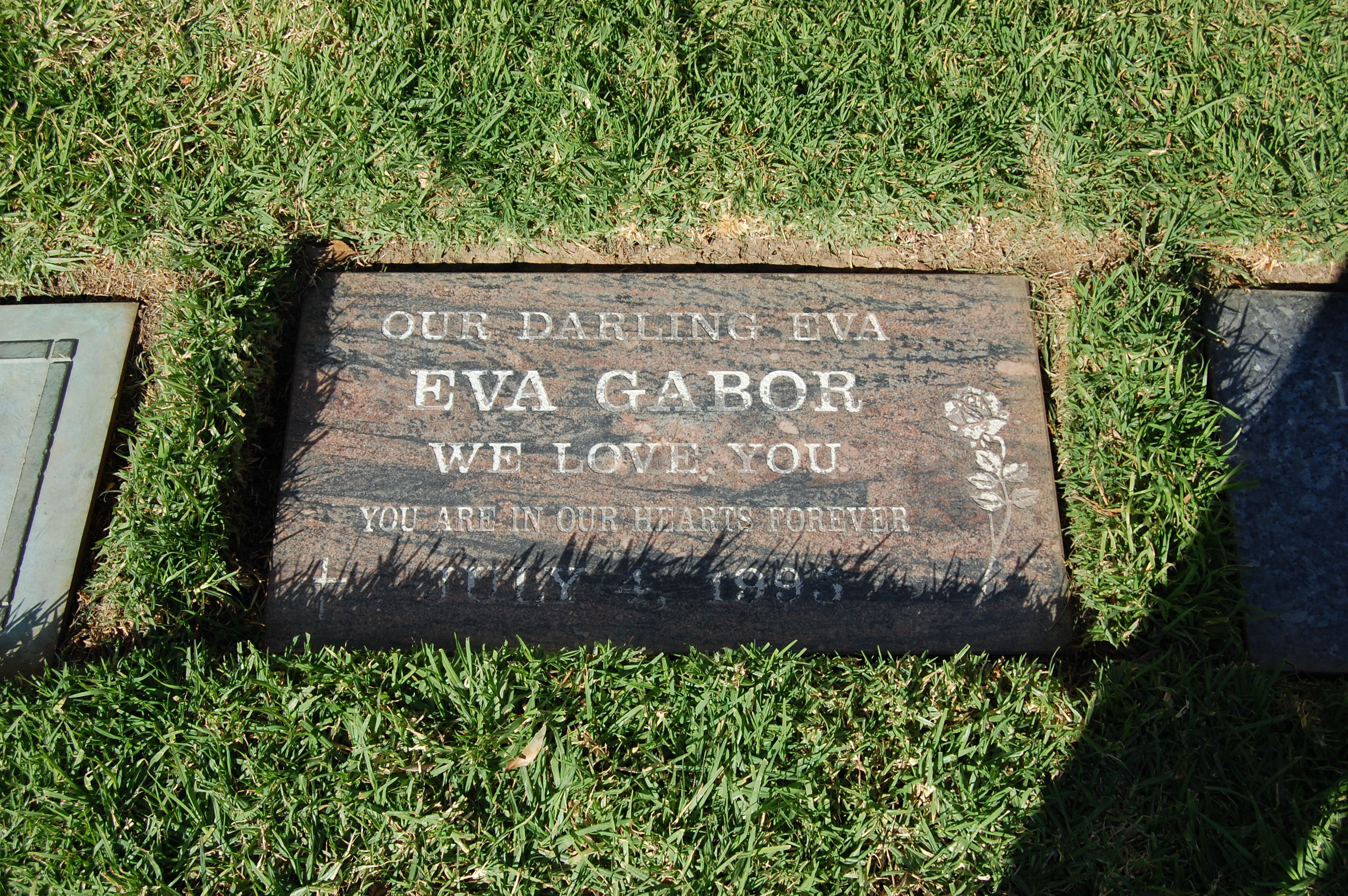
Gabor's grave

Gabor died in Los Angeles on Independence Day 1995, from respiratory failure and pneumonia, following a fall in a bathtub in Mexico, where she had been on vacation. Her funeral was held on July 11, 1995, at Good Shepherd Catholic Church in Beverly Hills.

The youngest sister, Eva predeceased her elder sisters and her mother. Eldest sister Magda and mother Jolie Gabor both died two years later, in 1997. Elder sister Zsa Zsa died from cardiac arrest on December 18, 2016.

== Theatre roles ==
Opening date	Closing date	Title	Role	Theatre
January 24, 1950	July 14, 1951	The Happy Time	Mignonette	Plymouth
March 26, 1956	March 31, 1956	Little Glass Clock	Gabrielle	John Golden
January 31, 1958	February 8, 1958	Present Laughter	Joanna Lyppiatt	Belasco
March 18, 1963	November 9, 1963	Tovarich	Tatiana (succeeded Vivien Leigh October 21)	Winter Garden
April 4, 1983	January 1, 1984	You Can't Take It with You	The Grand Duchess Olga Katrina (succeeded Colleen Dewhurst)	Plymouth; Royale

== Film roles ==
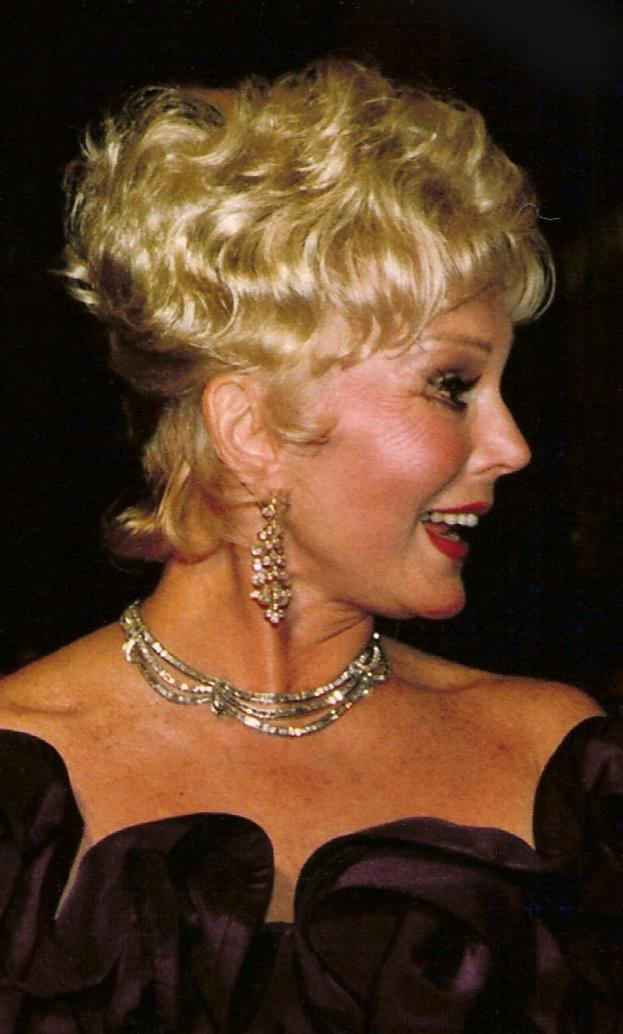

Year	Title	Role	Notes
1941	Forced Landing	Johanna Van Deuren	
1941	New York Town	Minor Role	Uncredited
1941	Pacific Blackout	Marie Duval	
1942	Star Spangled Rhythm	Eva Gabor	Uncredited
1945	A Royal Scandal	Countess Demidow	Uncredited
1946	The Wife of Monte Cristo	Mme. Lucille Maillard	
1949	Song of Surrender	Countess Marina	
1952	Love Island	Sarna	
1953	Paris Model	Gogo Montaine	
1954	The Mad Magician	Claire Ormond	
1954	Captain Kidd and the Slave Girl	Judith Duvall	
1954	The Last Time I Saw Paris	Lorraine Quarl	
1955	Artists and Models	Sonia / Mrs. Curtis	
1957	The Truth About Women	Louise Tiere	
1957	My Man Godfrey	Francesca Gray	
1957	Don't Go Near the Water	Deborah Aldrich	
1958	Gigi	Liane d'Exelmans	
1959	It Started with a Kiss	Marquesa Marion de la Rey	
1963	A New Kind of Love	Felicienne Courbeau	
1964	Youngblood Hawke	Fannie Prince	
1970	The Aristocats	Duchess	Voice
1977	The Rescuers	Miss Bianca	Voice
1979	Nutcracker Fantasy	Queen of Time	Voice
1987	The Princess Academy	Countess Von Pupsin	
1990	The Rescuers Down Under	Miss Bianca	Voice

== Television roles ==
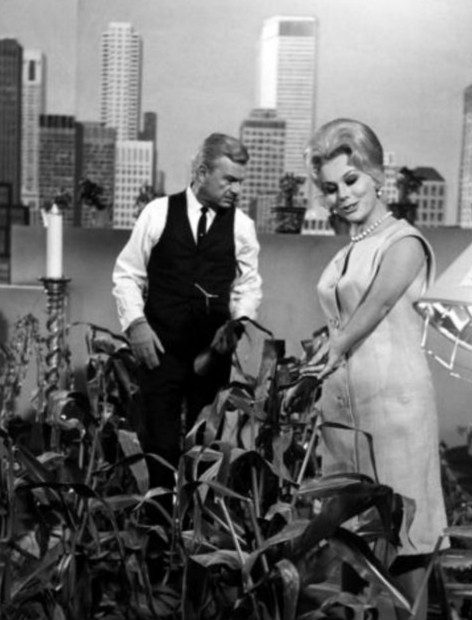
Gabor (right) on the set of Green Acres with Eddie Albert (left), August 1965

Year	Title	Role	Notes
1951	Tales of Tomorrow	Laura	Episode: "The Invader", an American anthology SciFi series performed and broadcast live
1953	The Eva Gabor Show	Herself	Host
1954–1955	Justice		2 episodes: "The Blackmailer", and "The Intruder"
1957	What's My Line?	Mystery Guest	Season No. 9, episode No. 12, overall episode No. 389
1959	Five Fingers	Maria Vodnay	Episode: "Station Break"
1960–1961	Harrigan and Son	Lillian Lovely	Two appearances
1965–1971	Green Acres	Lisa Douglas	Lead role
1968	Here's Lucy	Eva Von Gronyitz	Episode: "Lucy and Eva Gabor"
1969	Wake Me When the War Is Over	Baroness Marlene	
1973–1982	Match Game	Recurring panelist	
1975	Tattletales		With husband Frank Jameson
1975	Ellery Queen	Magda Szomony	Episode: "The Adventure of the Blunt Instrument"
1977	The Love Boat	Beverly Blanchard	Episode No. 10: "Dear Beverly/The Strike/Special Delivery"
1981	Jack London's Tales of the Klondike	Loraine, the Hungarian gold digger	Episode: "Scorn of Women"
1981	Fantasy Island	Anastasia Dexter	Episode: "My Late Lover/Sanctuary"
1982	Hart to Hart	Renee	Episode: "With This Hart I Thee Wed"
1982	Madame's Place	Herself	Episode: "Everyone Has Their Dream Role"
1983	The Edge of Night	Cast member	
1986	Bridges to Cross	Maria Talbot	
1990	Return to Green Acres	Lisa Douglas	
1990	Close Encounters	Eva Hill	
1993	The Legend of the Beverly Hillbillies	Herself	
1995	This Is Your Life	Herself	

== See also ==
- Gabor sisters
- Eva Gabor portrait by Americo Makk
