= Francesca Hilton =

American actress (1947–2015)

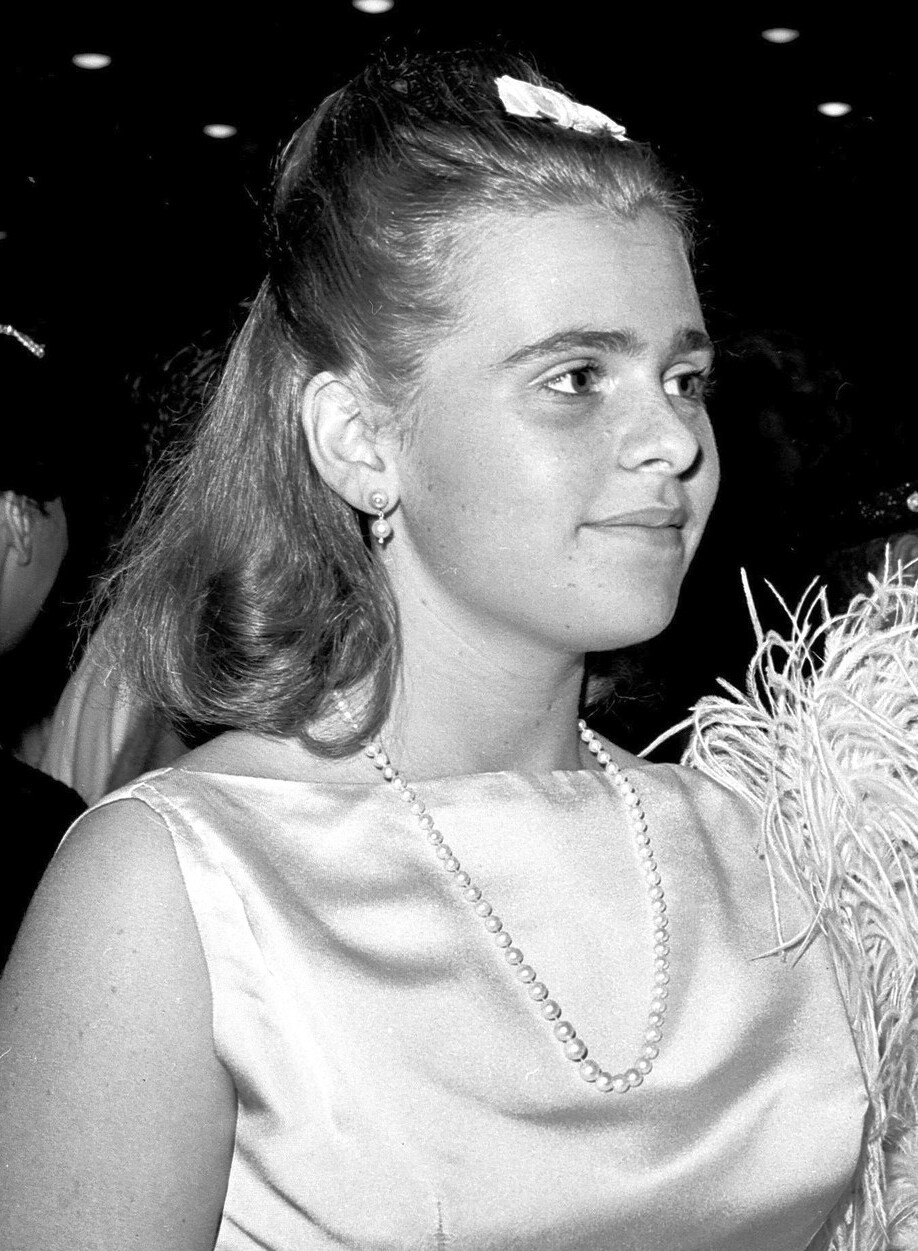
- Hilton in 1963
- Born: Constance Francesca Gabor Hilton; March 10, 1947; New York City, U.S.
- Died: January 5, 2015 (aged 67); Los Angeles, California, U.S.
- Burial place: Westwood Village Memorial Park Cemetery
- Occupations: Actress; comedian
- Spouse: Joseph Piche (m. 1993; div. 2010)
- Parents: Conrad Hilton; Zsa Zsa Gabor
- Family: Hilton family

Constance Francesca Gabor Hilton (March 10, 1947 – January 5, 2015), known as Francesca Hilton, was an American actress and comedian, member of the Hilton family. She was the only child of Hilton Hotels founder Conrad Hilton and his second wife, actress and socialite Zsa Zsa Gabor.

== Early life and family ==
Hilton was born in 1947 in New York City, after her parents were granted a divorce in September 1946. Her father, Conrad Hilton, was the founder of the Hilton Hotels chain. Her mother Zsa Zsa Gabor and her aunts (Eva and Magda) were Hungarian-born actresses and socialites. Gabor's 1991 autobiography One Lifetime Is Not Enough alleged that her pregnancy was a result of rape by then-husband Conrad Hilton.

She was the only child of Zsa Zsa Gabor and therefore the only descendant of the Gabor sisters as well as the only daughter of Conrad Hilton. Her three half-brothers were Conrad Hilton Jr., Barron Hilton, and Eric Hilton. She attended movie premieres with her mother and competed in equestrian competitions as a child. In 1947, while Hilton was an infant, a burglar entered their home and tied up Zsa Zsa Gabor and their housekeeper, and threatened to kill Francesca. The burglar stole jewelry worth over $750,000.

Francesca worked in reservations at the Beverly Hilton Hotel in Beverly Hills, California, during summers as a teenager. At the time of her death, she was engaged to Michael Natsis. According to her publicist, Edward Lozzi, she had been writing an autobiography. She also worked for the Conrad N. Hilton Foundation.

When Conrad Hilton died in 1979, he left most of his wealth to the Conrad N. Hilton Foundation. Francesca Hilton contested the will, which left her only $100,000, but lost the suit. In 2005, her stepfather, Frédéric Prinz von Anhalt, filed lawsuits against her accusing her of fraud in obtaining a loan using her mother's house as collateral, and manipulation over her mother's will; the court threw out the case for lack of evidence after Gabor did not appear or sign a statement. Hilton denied the allegations. In 2012 she successfully sued for an independent conservatorship to be set up for the care of her mother, who had become incapacitated, but the judge appointed Von Anhalt as temporary conservator.

Hilton lived in Los Angeles for most of her life. A month before her death in 2015, she was impoverished and living in weekly rental apartments and in her car.

== Performing career ==
She appeared in A Safe Place in 1971 and The Gravy Train in 1974. She worked as a photographer in the 1980s. By 2008, she started performing at The Comedy Store in West Hollywood. Her show centered on her family. She joked that her great-nieces, Paris Hilton and Nicky Hilton, were "pole dancers and porn stars".

== Death ==
Hilton died at Cedars-Sinai Medical Center in Los Angeles on January 5, 2015, after suffering a major stroke. She was 67 years old. Her mother was then 97 and suffering from dementia, and was reportedly never informed of her death; her stepfather sought unsuccessfully to take possession of Hilton's body. After it remained in the morgue for several days, an autopsy was performed and her half-brother Barron Hilton took possession of her body.

Hilton's funeral was held at St. Ambrose Catholic Church, West Hollywood. She was cremated and her ashes interred at the Westwood Village Memorial Park Cemetery, close to her aunt, Eva Gabor.

== Filmography ==
=== Film ===
Year	Title	Role	Notes
1971	A Safe Place	Noah's Friend #5	
1973	Cleopatra Jones	Shoplifter	Uncredited
1974	The Gravy Train	Girl in Restaurant	
1995	Liz: The Elizabeth Taylor Story	Woman #1	TV movie
1997	Pterodactyl Woman from Beverly Hills	Helene	
1999	Forever Fabulous	PTA Mother	Final film role

=== Television ===
Year	Title	Role	Notes
1967	Good Company	Herself	1 episode
1970	Philbin's People	Herself	1 episode
1973	Cannon	Carrie	1 episode
1974	V.I.P.-Schaukel	Herself	1 episode
1984	Tattletales	Herself	1 episode
1998	Intimate Portrait	Herself	1 episode
1998	E! True Hollywood Story	Herself	1 episode
2000	Biography	Herself	1 episode
2007-2008	Entertainment Tonight	Herself	2 episodes
2015	Inside Edition	Herself	1 episode, archive footage
