= Conrad Hilton Jr. =

American socialite, hotel heir, and businessman (1926–1969)

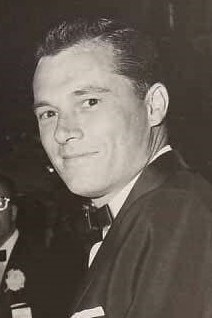
- Hilton in 1957
- Born: Conrad Nicholson Hilton Jr. July 6, 1926; Dallas, Texas, U.S.
- Died: February 5, 1969 (aged 42); Los Angeles, California, U.S.
- Occupation: Businessman
- Spouses: Elizabeth Taylor (m. 1950; div. 1951); Patricia McClintock (m. 1958; sep. 1967)
- Children: 2
- Father: Conrad Hilton
- Relatives: Hilton family

Conrad Nicholson "Nicky" Hilton Jr. (July 6, 1926 – February 5, 1969) was an American socialite, hotel heir, and businessman. He was the eldest son of Hilton Hotels founder Conrad Hilton.

== Life and career ==
Conrad Nicholson Hilton Jr. was born in Dallas, Texas. His parents were Conrad Hilton, the founder of Hilton Hotels, and Mary Adelaide Barron. Hilton had three younger siblings: Barron, Eric, and Francesca. He was a grand-uncle of Paris Hilton and Nicky Hilton.

Growing up, he did take an interest in the family business and he dropped out of Loyola University in Los Angeles to join the Navy. His father enrolled him at École hôtelière de Lausanne in Lausanne, Switzerland, but he was suspended after six months.

In 1951, Hilton became the vice president of the Hilton Corporation and manager of the Bel Air Hotel. In May 1954, Hilton was arrested for drinking in public and received two years of probation.

In his later years, Hilton was a director and chairman of the executive committee of the Hilton International Company. Hilton died at the age of 42 from a sudden heart attack most likely due to alcoholism on February 5, 1969. His funeral was held at St. Paul's Church in Los Angeles. He is interred in Holy Cross Cemetery in Culver City, California.

== Personal life ==
Hilton dated various Hollywood starlets and gained a reputation for being a playboy.

In October 1949, Hilton met Elizabeth Taylor at the Mocambo nightclub in Los Angeles. The couple were married in a highly publicized ceremony at the Church of the Good Shepherd in Beverly Hills on May 6, 1950. They had a tempestuous eight-month marriage due to his gambling, drinking, heroin addiction, and abusive behavior. During one of his violent outbursts, Hilton kicked Taylor in the stomach and caused her to have a miscarriage. Taylor announced their separation in December 1950; she was granted a divorce on grounds of mental cruelty on January 29, 1951.

In September 1951, actress Betsy von Furstenberg announced her engagement to Hilton. The couple planned to marry the following spring, but were never married.

In the 1950s, Hilton dated actresses Terry Moore, Mamie Van Doren, Arlene Solof, and Jeanne Carmen. In 1957, he dated actresses Natalie Wood and Joan Collins at the same time. Shortly after, he dated Mexican actress Silvia Pinal, who he met at the opening of a hotel in Acapulco.

In 1958, Hilton married Patricia McClintock, an oil heiress from Oklahoma. They had two sons, Conrad Nicholson Hilton III and Michael Otis Hilton. Their marriage deteriorated as Hilton became addicted to the sleeping pill Seconal and mixed it with hard liquor. McClintock sued for divorce on February 10, 1964. She charged Hilton with "causing her extreme mental and physical suffering" but they later reconciled. In August 1967, McClintock filed for divorce again, accusing Hilton of "repeated acts and threats of violence." The divorce was never granted, but Hilton and McClintock were separated at the time of Hilton's death.
