= All Saints' Episcopal Church (Beverly Hills, California) =

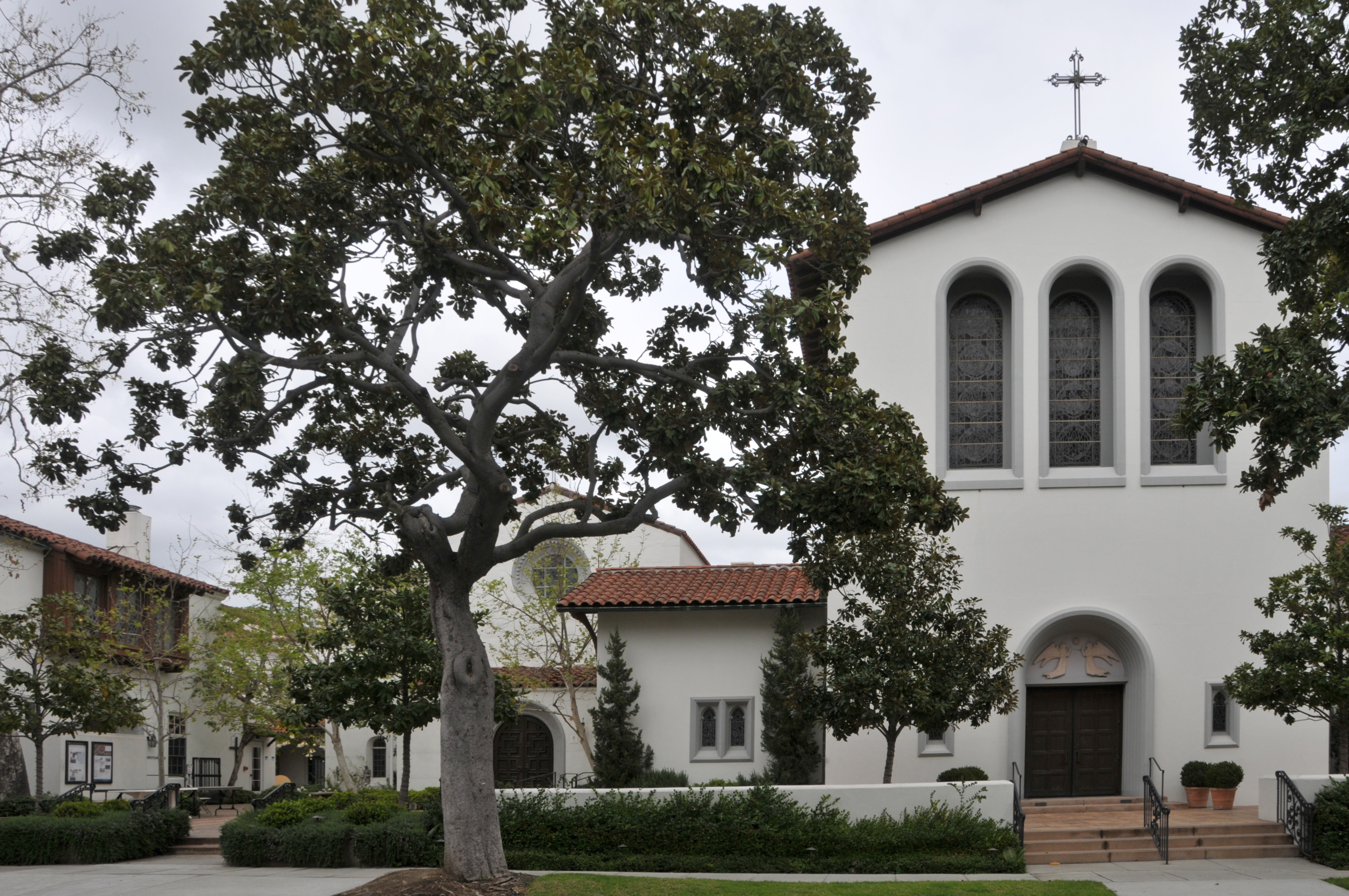
- All Saints' Episcopal Church
- 34.07073°N 118.40566°W
- Location: 504 North Camden Drive, Beverly Hills, California
- Country: USA
- Denomination: Episcopal Church
- Website: allsaintsbh.org

History
- Founded: 1926
- Dedication: 1951

Administration
- Diocese: Episcopal Diocese of Los Angeles

Clergy
- Bishop: John H. Taylor
- Rector: Andrea McMillin

All Saints' Episcopal Church is an Episcopal church in Beverly Hills, California.

== Location ==
It is located at 504 on North Camden Drive in Beverly Hills, California.

== History ==
The congregation first met at the Beverly Hills Hotel from 1922 onwards. Four years later, in 1926, a chapel was built. By 1935, it became a parish in its own right.

Several decades later, in 1951, a new church building was erected, though the chapel was preserved. The organ was made by Casavant Frères for the new church in 1951.

Every week, the church serves 'The Monday Meal' to 130 - 150 guests, many of whom are homeless. In March 2012, artist Lisa Lesniak sold her paintings of the homeless as a fundraiser for the church.

The church is a member of the Congregational LGBT Ministries of the Episcopal Diocese of Los Angeles.

On Ash Wednesday in 2015, the deacon from All Saints' offered ashes to passers-by on the streets of Beverly Hills together with the deacon of Church of the Good Shepherd.

== Leadership ==
Rev. J. Herbert Smith served as rector until 1969, when Rev. Kermit Castellanos served as rector until 1975. During the latter's tenure, membership grew from 200 to 1,000. In 1977, Rev. Carol Anderson became the rector. She was the first woman to serve as rector. She was credited with bringing a more charismatic approach to her sermons.
