= St. Ambrose Church (West Hollywood, California) =

- Saint Ambrose Church
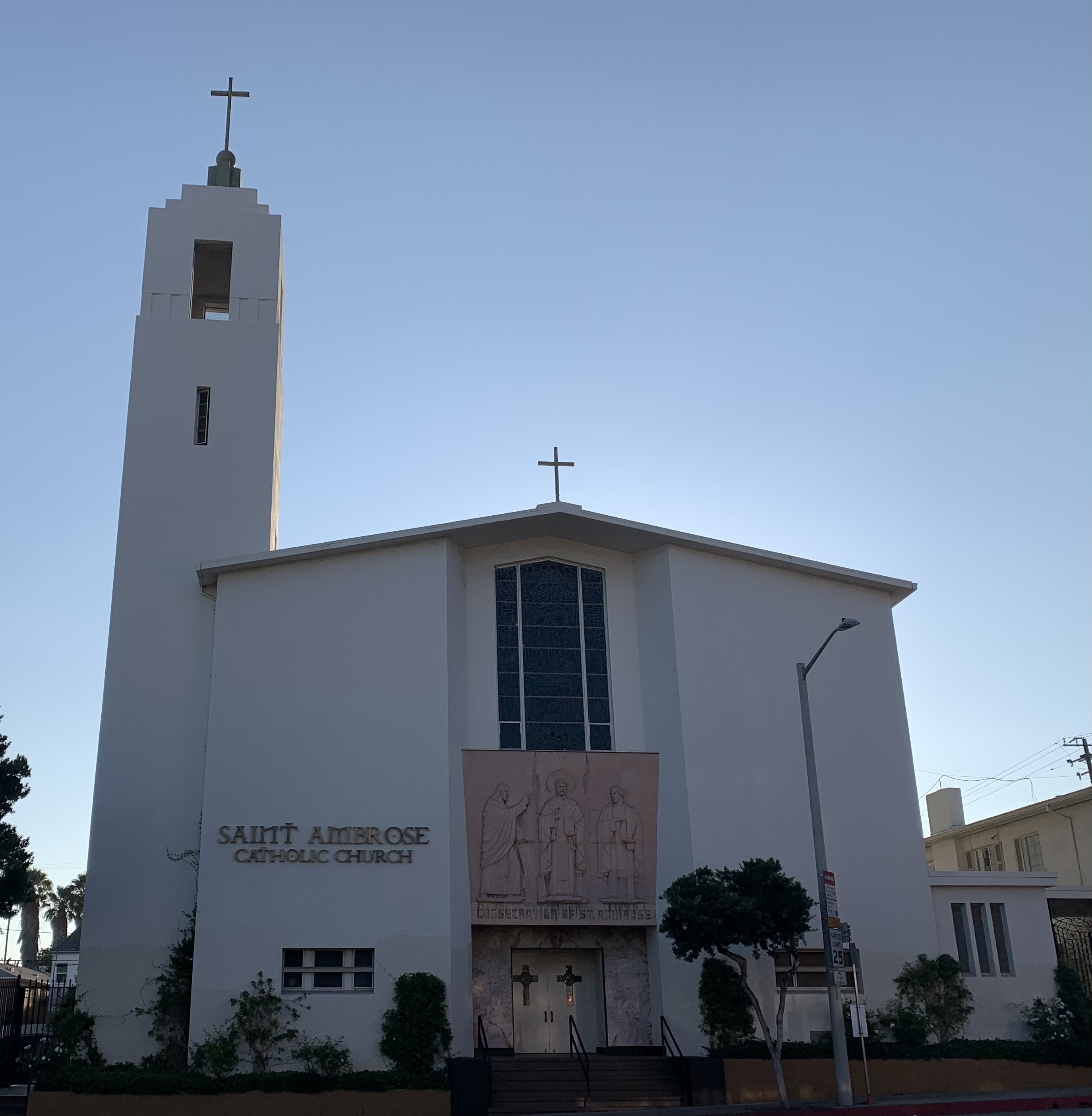
- St. Ambrose Church
- 34.0941°N 118.36192°W
- Location: 1281 North Fairfax Avenue, West Hollywood, California
- Country: USA
- Denomination: Roman Catholic
- Website: stambroseweho.org

History
- Dedication: St. Ambrose
- Dedicated: May 20, 1951

Architecture
- Architect: Ross Montgomery

Administration
- Division: Our Lady of the Angels Pastoral Region
- Diocese: Archdiocese of Los Angeles

Clergy
- Archbishop: José Horacio Gómez
- Bishop: Matthew Elshoff
- Priest: Fr. Dennis Marrell

St. Ambrose Church is a parish of the Roman Catholic Church in West Hollywood, California. The current parish church is located at 1281 North Fairfax Avenue.

== History ==
The parish was organized by Fr. Thomas N. O'Toole in 1922, and held its first services at the former Granada Theatre near Sunset and Gardner Street on November 26. Work on a permanent church, designed by architect Ross Montgomery, began in 1923, with the first services held on Easter Sunday, April 20, 1924. It was dedicated by Archbishop John Joseph Cantwell on May 18, 1924.

The growing congregation acquired the adjacent land in 1929, on which it opened a parochial school in 1935, a convent in 1937, and a rectory in 1949. Construction on the current church began in 1950, and Archbishop James Francis McIntyre presided over the dedication of the current church on May 20, 1951.

As a child, Roger Wagner (1914-1992) was an organist in this church.

Francesca Hilton's funeral was held at the church.
