= Eric Hilton =

American hotelier (1933–2016)

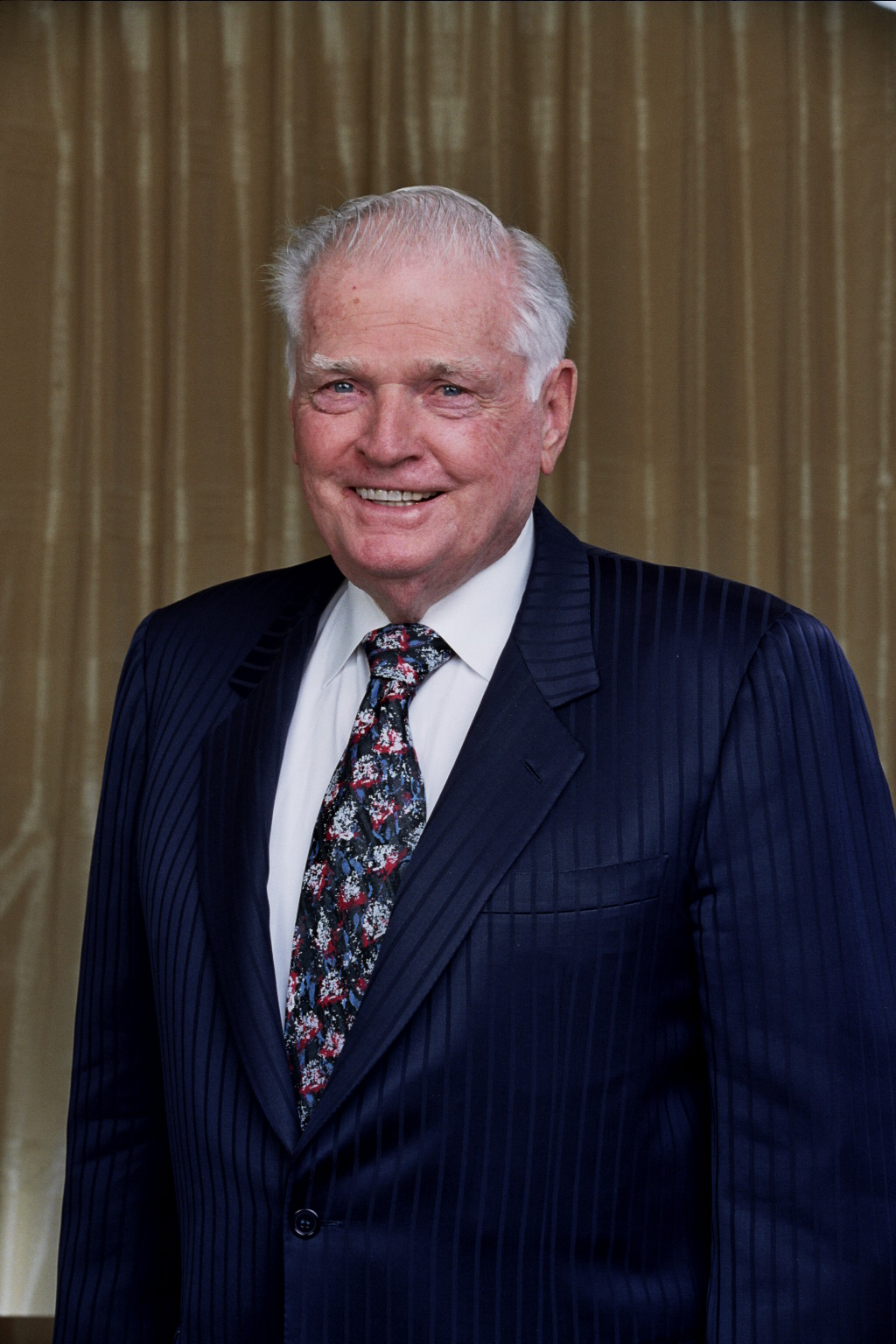
- Born: Eric Michael Hilton; July 1, 1933; Dallas, Texas, U.S.
- Died: December 10, 2016 (aged 83); Las Vegas, Nevada, U.S.
- Education: Texas Western College
- Occupations: Hotelier; philanthropist
- Spouse: Patricia Ann Skipworth (m. 1954)
- Children: 4
- Father: Conrad Hilton
- Relatives: Hilton family

Eric Michael Hilton (July 1, 1933 – December 10, 2016) was an American heir, hotelier, and philanthropist.

== Early life ==
Eric Hilton was born on July 1, 1933, in Dallas, Texas, the third son of Conrad Hilton, founder of the Hilton Hotels Corporation, and Mary Adelaide Hilton (née Barron).

Growing up in El Paso, Texas, Hilton was educated at El Paso High School and graduated from Texas Western College. He served as a radar specialist in the Army in the Korean War.

== Career ==
Hilton started his career at the Hilton Hotels Corporation, in 1949. He first worked at the El Paso Hilton, working his way up from "bellman, doorman, steward, cook, elevator operator, desk clerk and telephone operator." Within a decade, in 1959, he became the manager of the Deshler Hilton in Columbus, Ohio. Two years later, in 1961, he became the manager of the Shamrock Hilton in Houston, Texas. He later served as the corporation's executive vice president. He also served on its board of directors. He served as its vice chairman from 1993 to 1997, when he retired.

== Philanthropy ==
Hilton served as the chairman of the BEST Foundation for a Drug-Free Tomorrow. He also served on the board of directors of the Little League Foundation of America from 1977 to 2016 Additionally, he served on the board of trustees of the Conrad N. Hilton Foundation.

Hilton founded the Nevada Medical Center. He also founded the Three Square Food Bank, a food bank in Clark County, Nevada, in 2007. By 2016, the food bank had spread to Lincoln County, Nye County and Esmeralda County.

Hilton received the Award of Merit from the American Vocational Association as well as the Alumni President's Award and an honorary Doctor of Humane Letters degree from the University of Houston.

== Personal life and death ==
Hilton married Patricia Ann Skipworth on August 14, 1954. They were introduced at Texas Western College in El Paso, Texas. They had four children:

- Eric M. Hilton, Jr. (1955-2019); one daughter, Caitlin Patricia Davis Hilton (born 1994), who is an attorney at Ogletree Deakins.
- Beverly Hilton-Neapolitan (born 1956), married to Robert Peter Neapolitan (born 1943)
- Linda Hilton-Buschini (born 1963); married Fabrizio Buschini in 1992, two sons; Nicholas Angelo Buschini (b. 1993) and Brandon Alessandro Buschini (b. 1995).
- J. Bradley Hilton (born 1967)

They raised their children in a residence in Houston, Texas.

Eric Hilton died on December 10, 2016, aged 83 with his children beside him. Hilton's wife, Patricia, died the following May also at the age of 83. A private ceremony was held at their Katy, Texas, home.

An on-campus restaurant in honor of Eric Hilton, Eric's, is part of the Hilton College of Hotel and Restaurant Management. The college students run all aspects and operations of the restaurant and bar.
