= Conrad Hilton =

American hotel tycoon and politician (1887–1979)

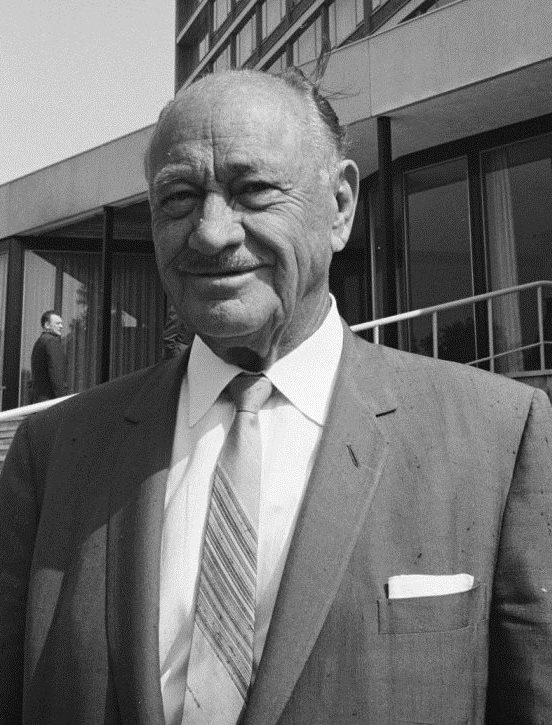
- Hilton in 1962

Member of the New Mexico House of Representatives from the 2nd district
- In office 1912–1916
- Preceded by: Legislature established
- Succeeded by: Quianu Robinson

Personal details
- Born: Conrad Nicholson Hilton; December 25, 1887 San Antonio, New Mexico Territory, U.S.
- Died: January 3, 1979 (aged 91) Santa Monica, California, U.S.
- Resting place: Calvary Hill Cemetery, Dallas, Texas, U.S.
- Party: Republican
- Spouses: Mary Adelaide Barron (m. 1925; div. 1934) Zsa Zsa Gabor (m. 1942; div. 1947) Mary Frances Kelly (m. 1976)
- Children: Conrad Jr.; Barron; Eric; Francesca
- Relatives: Hilton family
- Occupation: Hotelier
- Known for: Hilton Hotels & Resorts

Conrad Nicholson Hilton (December 25, 1887 – January 3, 1979) was an American hotel magnate and politician who founded the Hilton Hotels chain. From 1912 to 1916, Hilton was a Republican representative in the first New Mexico Legislature, but became disillusioned with the "inside deals" of politics. In 1919, he purchased his first hotel, the Mobley Hotel in Cisco, Texas, for US$40,000 (equivalent to $742,802 in 2025) and subsequently capitalized on the oil boom. The rooms were rented out in eight-hour shifts. He continued to purchase and sell hotels, and eventually established the world's first international hotel chain. When he died in 1979, he left the bulk of his estate to the Conrad N. Hilton Foundation.

== Early life ==
Hilton was born on December 25, 1887, in San Antonio, Socorro County, New Mexico territory, to Norwegian-born Augustus Halvorsen Hilton (1854–1919) and Mary Genevieve Laufersweiler, a devout Catholic of German descent. He attended the Goss Military Academy (since renamed as the New Mexico Military Institute) and St. Michael's College (later called the Santa Fe University of Art and Design), and the New Mexico School of Mines (now New Mexico Tech). From 1912 to 1916, Hilton was a Republican representative in the first New Mexico Legislature, when the state was newly formed. Hilton became frustrated with the "bureaucracy, slowness, cheating, lying, and inside deals of politics," and in 1916, he refused to run for a fourth term, instead endorsing his longtime political ally, Quianu Robinson.

He served two years in the United States Army during World War I. After completing Officer Training School, he became a second lieutenant, and served in Paris in the Quartermaster Corps. While Hilton was in France with the army after the war, his father was killed in a car crash.

The most enduring influences to shape Hilton's philanthropic philosophy, beyond that of his parents, were the Catholic Church and his sisters. He credited his mother with guiding him to prayer and the church whenever he was troubled or dismayed—from the boyhood loss of a beloved pony, to severe financial losses during the Great Depression. His mother continually told him that prayer was the best investment he would ever make.

== Career ==
As a young boy, Hilton developed entrepreneurial skills working at his father's general store in Socorro County, New Mexico, which was partially converted into a 10-room hotel. This was followed by varied experiences, including a stint as a representative in New Mexico's first State Legislature, and a career decision to become a banker.

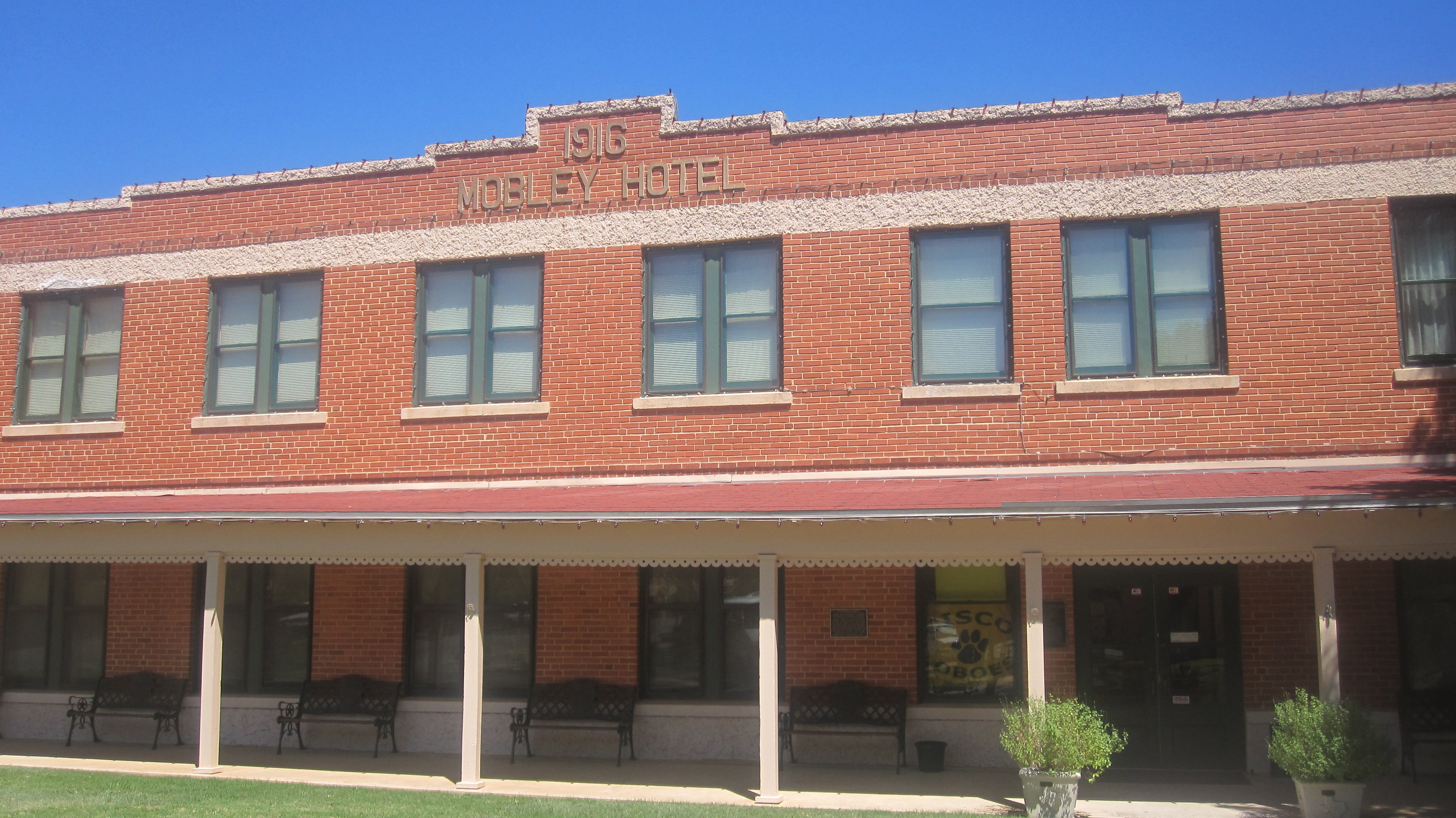
Mobley Hotel in Cisco, Texas.

He intended to buy a bank when he arrived in Texas at the height of the Texas oil boom. In 1919, he instead bought his first hotel, the 40-room Mobley Hotel in Cisco, Texas, when a bank purchase fell through. The hotel did such brisk business that rooms changed hands as often as three times a day, and the dining room was converted into additional rooms to meet the demand. He went on to buy and build hotels throughout Texas, including the high-rise Dallas Hilton, which opened in 1925; the Abilene Hilton in 1927; Waco Hilton in 1928; and El Paso Hilton in 1930. The first hotel outside of Texas that Hilton built was in 1939 in Albuquerque, New Mexico, today it is known as the Hotel Andaluz. During the Great Depression, Hilton was nearly forced into bankruptcy and lost several of his hotels. Nevertheless, he was retained as manager of a combined chain, and eventually regained control of his remaining eight hotels.

Over the next decade, he expanded west to California and east to Chicago and New York, crowning his expansions with such acquisitions as the Stevens Hotel in Chicago (then the world's largest hotel; it was renamed the Conrad Hilton), and the fabled Waldorf-Astoria in New York City. He formed the Hilton Hotels Corporation in 1946, and Hilton International Company in 1948.

During the 1950s and 1960s, Hilton Hotels' worldwide expansion facilitated both American tourism and overseas business by American corporations. It was the world's first international hotel chain, at the same time establishing a certain worldwide standard for hotel accommodations. In 1954, Hilton Hotels bought the Hotels Statler Company, Inc. for $111 million, then the world's largest real estate transaction. In all, Hilton eventually owned 188 hotels in 38 cities across the U.S., including the Mayflower Hotel in Washington, D.C.; the Palmer House in Chicago; and the Plaza Hotel and Waldorf-Astoria in New York City, along with 54 hotels abroad. He later purchased the Carte Blanche Credit Company and an interest in the American Crystal Sugar Company, as well as other enterprises.

Hilton received honorary degrees from the University of Detroit (1953), DePaul University (1954), Barat College (1955), Adelphi College (1957), Sophia University, Tokyo (1963), and the University of Albuquerque (1975). Hilton's autobiography, Be My Guest, was published in 1958 by Prentice Hall. In 1966, Hilton was succeeded as president by his son, Barron, and was elected chairman of the board.

== Personal life ==
In 1925, Hilton married Mary Adelaide Barron (1906–1966). They had three sons, Conrad Hilton Jr., Barron Hilton, and Eric Hilton, before divorcing in 1934.

In 1942, Hilton married actress Zsa Zsa Gabor. They had one child, a daughter, Francesca Hilton, before divorcing in 1947. Gabor wrote in her 1991 autobiography One Lifetime Is Not Enough that she became pregnant by Hilton only after he raped her during their marriage. Francesca died in 2015, at age 67, from a stroke.

In 1950, Hilton bought Casa Encantada at 10644 Bellagio Road in Bel Air, Los Angeles, and occupied the house until he died in 1979. Hilton described his enchantment with the house as "... a case of love at first sight ... I couldn't resist it, one of the fabulous houses of the world." He renamed the property the Casa Encantada ("enchanted house").

In 1957, Hilton was initiated as a member of Tau Kappa Epsilon fraternity at New Mexico State University.

In 1976, Hilton married Mary Frances Kelly. Their marriage lasted until his death three years later in 1979.

On January 3, 1979, Hilton died of pneumonia at the age of 91. He was interred at Calvary Hill Cemetery, a Catholic cemetery in Dallas, Texas. He left US$500,000 (equivalent to $1.7 million in 2024) to his two surviving sons, US$100,000 (equivalent to $350,000 in 2024) to his daughter, Francesca, and US$15,000 (equivalent to $52,000 in 2024) to each of his grandchildren.

=== Hilton family fortune ===
In 1969, James C. Taylor presented plans to build a hospitality college on the campus of the University of Houston to Barron Hilton. Barron then presented the plans to his father, who donated US$1.5 million (equivalent to $9.8 million in 2024) for the completion of the project. The Hilton College of Hotel and Restaurant Management opened to students in September 1969.

The bulk of Conrad Hilton's estate was left to the Conrad N. Hilton Foundation, which he established in 1944. His son, Barron Hilton, who spent much of his career helping build the Hilton Hotels Corporation, contested the will—despite having left the company as acting president, chief executive officer, and chairman of the board of directors. A settlement was reached, and as a result, Barron Hilton received 4 million shares of the hotel enterprise, the Conrad N. Hilton Foundation received 3.5 million shares, and the remaining 6 million shares were placed in the W. Barron Hilton Charitable Remainder Unitrust. Upon Barron Hilton's death, Unitrust assets were transferred to the Hilton Foundation, of which Barron previously served on the board of directors as chairman.

In 1983, the Hilton Foundation donated US$21.3 million (equivalent to $56.2 million in 2024) to expand facilities and increase endowment. That gift led to the construction of the South Wing, which opened in 1989, and added 94,000 square feet (8,700 m^{2}) of education and meeting space to Hilton College.

On December 25, 2007, Barron Hilton announced that he would leave about 97% of his fortune, then estimated at US$2.36 billion (equivalent to $3.4 billion in 2024), to a charitable unit trust that would eventually be merged with the Conrad N. Hilton Foundation.

== Legacy ==
- The Conrad N. Hilton Foundation was established in 1944 by Conrad N. Hilton. Its mission is the alleviation of human suffering worldwide.
- The Conrad N. Hilton Humanitarian Prize was created in 1996 by The Conrad N. Hilton Foundation.
- The Conrad N. Hilton College is a hospitality college of the University of Houston named after Conrad Hilton.
- The Conrad N. Hilton Library is located at the Hyde Park campus of the Culinary Institute of America.
- At Loyola Marymount University are The Conrad N. Hilton Chair in Business Ethics, The Hilton Distinguished Entrepreneur Award, and the Conrad N. Hilton Endowed Chair of Entrepreneurship in the College of Business Administration.
- In 2009, actor Chelcie Ross played the role of Conrad "Connie" Hilton in the television show Mad Men for six episodes.

== Autobiographies ==
- Be My Guest: Autobiography of Conrad Hilton (Prentice-Hall, Inc. 1958)
- Inspirations of an Innkeeper (privately printed, 1963)

== Sources ==
- Alef, Daniel. Conrad N. Hilton: Reveled in Hotel Deals (Titans of Fortune Publishing, 2009)
- Bolton, Whitney. The Silver Spade; the Conrad Hilton Story. with a foreword by Conrad Hilton (New York: Farrar, Straus and Young, 1954)
- Comfort, Mildred Houghton. Conrad N. Hilton, Hotelier (Minneapolis: T.S. Denison & Company, Inc., 1965)
- Dabney, Thomas Ewing. The Man Who Bought the Waldorf: The Life of Conrad N. Hilton (Duell Sloan & Pearce, 1950)
- Oppenheimer, Jerry. House of Hilton: From Conrad to Paris: A Drama of Wealth, Power, and Privilege (Three Rivers Press. 2007)
- Hilton, Conrad N. Be My Guest (Englewood Cliffs: Prentice-Hall, Inc., 1958)
