= Church of the Good Shepherd (Beverly Hills, California) =

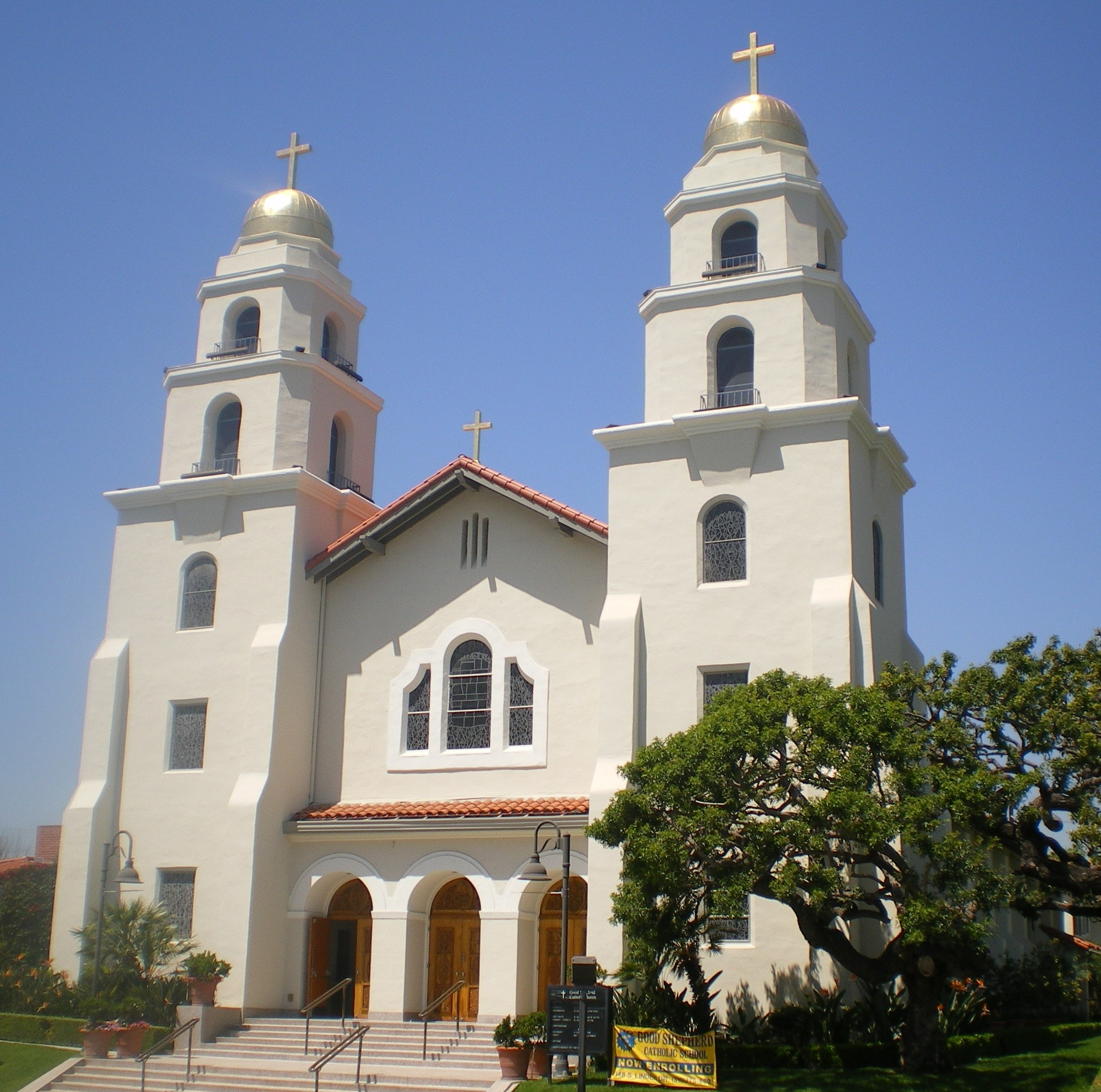
- Church of the Good Shepherd
- 34°4′10″N 118°24′27″W
- Location: 504 North Roxbury Drive, Beverly Hills, California
- Country: United States
- Denomination: Catholic
- Website: gsbh.org

History
- Founded: December 12, 1923
- Dedicated: February 1, 1925

Architecture
- Architect: James J. Donnellan
- Architectural type: Mission Revival Style architecture

Administration
- Division: Our Lady of the Angels Pastoral Region
- Diocese: Archdiocese of Los Angeles

Clergy
- Archbishop: José Horacio Gómez
- Bishop: Francisco Ortega
- Pastor: Fr. Santiago Rossi

The Church of the Good Shepherd is a historic Catholic church at 504 North Roxbury Drive in Beverly Hills, California.

== History ==
On December 12, 1923, the parish was founded, and its church designed by architect James J. Donnellan in 1924. It is Mission Revival Style architecture. On February 1, 1925, Bishop John Joseph Cantwell presided over the dedication of the church building. Monsignor John J. Cawley, Vicar General of Los Angeles, Right Reverend Monsignor McCarthy of Pasadena, and Reverend Michael J. Mullins, pastor of the church also attended the dedication. It is the oldest church in Beverly Hills.

In 1959, it was renovated, and a new marble main altar and two side altars were added. Sealed in each altar were the relics of Saints Felicitas and Perpetua and Saint Vibiana, patroness of the Los Angeles Archdiocese.

On Ash Wednesday in 2015, the deacon from Good Shepherd offered ashes to passers-by on the streets of Beverly Hills together with the deacon of All Saints' Episcopal Church.

== Stained glass ==
The original stained glass was shipped from France, Germany, the British Isles and the U.S. It was renovated by the Paul Phillips Studio in 1959. It depicts the following saints:

- (Along the nave, from the rear to the altar on the right): John the Evangelist, Saint Patrick, Saint Joseph, Paul the Apostle, Madonna and Child, and Good Shepherd.
- (Along the nave, from the rear to the altar on the left): the Sacred Heart of Jesus, Saint Peter, St Michael the Archangel, Saint Anthony of Padua, and Saint Anne with the Young Blessed Virgin.
- (In the Reconciliation rooms): Saint Agnes and Saint Cecilia.
- (In the vestibule): three small windows showing the heads of cherubs bordered by roses.
- (In the sacristy workrooms): one window shows wheat stalks and host; another window shows grapes and grapevines surrounding a chalice.
- (In the vesting room): one window on the left shows a thurible framed by a priest's stole; the window next to it shows a lectionary with a bookmark and the words "Leccio Sti. Petri Apostli."; the window on the right shows a chalice, candles and a cross.

== Parishioners ==
Over the years, this small house of worship has been the local parish church for most of the Catholic movie stars who live in Beverly Hills, from Rudolph Valentino to Bing Crosby (who both attended Sunday Mass here). It has seen numerous celebrity weddings and funerals. Celebrity weddings have included Elizabeth Taylor and Conrad "Nicky" Hilton, Loretta Young and Tom Lewis, Mark Wahlberg and Rhea Durham, and Carmen Miranda and David Sebastian. Celebrity funerals have included Rudolph Valentino (1926), Carmen Miranda (1955), Gary Cooper (1961), William Frawley (1966), Sharon Tate (1969), Pier Angeli (1971), Jack Haley (1979), Alfred Hitchcock (1980), Vincente Minnelli (1986), Rita Hayworth (1987), Danny Thomas (1991), Eva Gabor (1995), Mary Frann (1998), Frank Sinatra (1998), Don Adams (2005), Merv Griffin (2007) and Zsa Zsa Gabor (2016).

A rosary was said at the church for the singer and actress Rosemary Clooney. In attendance were George Clooney, Kathryn Crosby, Frank Sinatra, Jr., Brian Wilson, Natalie Cole, Diahann Carroll, and Rose Marie. Her actual funeral service was held at St. Patrick's, in her hometown of Maysville, Kentucky. Actor Gary Cooper had converted to Catholicism at this parish a few years before his death. His funeral service was held at the church on the same day as the 13th Primetime Emmy Awards.

It was the location for the funeral scene in the film A Star Is Born (1954), which starred Judy Garland and James Mason.
