= Hilton College of Hotel and Restaurant Management =

Business college in the United States

Coordinates: 29.7188°N 95.3415°W

University of Houston, Conrad N. Hilton College of Global Hospitality Leadership
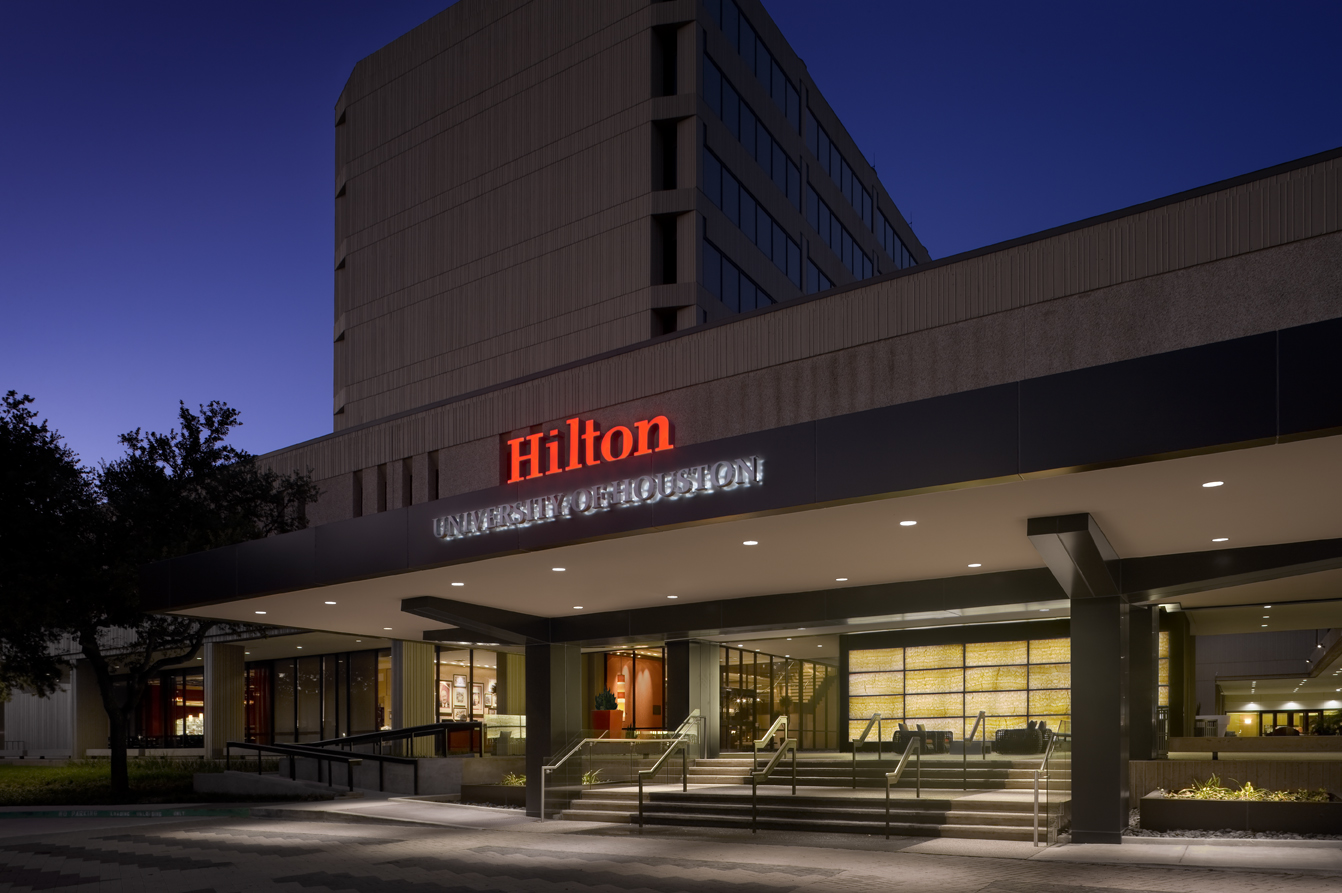
- Type: Public college
- Established: 1969
- Parent institution: University of Houston
- Dean: Dennis E. Reynolds
- Undergraduates: 1,092
- Postgraduates: 108
- Location: Houston, Texas, United States
- Campus: Urban
- Website: www.uh.edu/hilton-college

The Conrad N. Hilton College of Global Hospitality Leadership (Hilton College) is a college at the University of Houston, a public research university in Houston, Texas, focused on hospitality. It is one of 13 academic colleges at the university that offers business degrees at the undergraduate and graduate levels.

== History ==
Hilton College was founded in 1969, when James C. Taylor, who would become the first dean, presented Eric and Barron Hilton—sons of Conrad Hilton—with plans to build a hospitality school at the University of Houston. When they presented the plans to their father, Conrad Hilton contributed $1.5 million for the completion of the project. Classes began at Hilton College on Sept. 16, 1969, with 39 students and three professors. Taylor was named the first dean.

The first class—consisting of eight students, most of whom began their hospitality studies elsewhere at UH—graduated from Hilton College in 1971.

In 1975, a new Hilton College facility opened, which included the Hilton University of Houston Hotel and Conference Center.

In 1983, the Hilton Foundation gave the college a $21.3-million grant to expand its facilities and increase endowment and operation support. That gift led to the construction of the South Wing, which opened in 1989 and added 94,000 square feet of education and meeting space to Hilton College.

In 2010, the Hilton University of Houston completed a $12.5-million renovation to upgrade its facilities and create an enhanced experiential-learning environment for the students of Hilton College. It was the first major renovation to the hotel since it opened in 1975.

Hilton College houses four hospitality-related research institutes, the Hospitality Hall of Honor, the Massad Family Library Research Center and the Hospitality Industry Archives.

On February 28, 2022, the Hilton College officially announced the name change from Conrad N. Hilton College of Hotel and Restaurant Management to the Conrad N. Hilton College of Global Hospitality Leadership.

== Barron's Restaurant ==
Barron's Restaurant, named for Barron Hilton, is the student-run restaurant at Hilton College. It was created as part of the College's focus on experiential learning. It is open for lunch, Monday-Friday, during the fall and spring semesters and is staffed entirely by students, from the managers, to the cooks, to the servers. Barron's serves as a lab for two Hilton College courses: Food & Beverage Service and Advanced Food & Beverage Management. Students in the Barron's courses are expected to learn foodservice and hospitality industry standards in the lecture portion of their studies, and then apply those teachings in their weekly lab shifts. In the fall of 2012, Barron's debuted a new, Bistro-inspired menu.

Hilton College students work in the kitchen of Barron's Restaurant.

== Cougar Grounds ==
In January 2009, the College opened the Cougar Grounds coffee shop, the first university coffee house in the U.S. to be run by students as part of a corollary education class. Cougar Grounds serves as the laboratory for an entrepreneurship class, in which students learn about small-business operations, including marketing and sales, price-setting, payroll, cost control, supply management and new product development.

== Hilton University of Houston ==
The Hilton University of Houston, a full-service Hilton hotel located in the Wheeler District of the university campus, and serves as the primary teaching facility for the Conrad N. Hilton College of Hotel and Restaurant Management. It was first built in 1975 and underwent a $12.5 million renovation in 2010. The hotel has 86 guest rooms and 25,000 square feet of banquet space. Student interns rotate through many of the positions at the hotel, including jobs in guest services, hotel operations and banquet services.

The UH campus and downtown Houston are seen from a room at the Hilton University of Houston Hotel & Conference Center.

== Hospitality Hall of Honor ==
Hilton College houses the Hospitality Hall of Honor, which was established in 1995 to recognize leaders in the hospitality industry. Each year since 1996, a small group of honorees has been inducted into the Hall. The induction ceremony includes a formal reception and dinner, which are held at the Hilton University of Houston and planned by a team of student leaders. The week of the ceremony, Hilton College hosts a series of industry-related Think Tanks for students.

== Student organizations ==
Students get the chance to network with hospitality-industry recruiters twice a year at Hilton College's spring and fall career fairs.

There are 16 student organizations at Hilton College, each of which has its own faculty mentor. The organizations, which cater to different sectors and aspects of the hospitality industry, all participate in community-service projects and networking events. The Hilton College student organizations include:

- Club managers Association of America (CMAA)
- Conrad N. Hilton Ambassadors
- Disney College Program
- Eta Sigma Delta
- Graduate Student Association (GSA)
- Green Team
- Hospitality Financial and Technology Professionals - Cougar Chapter (HFTP-CC)
- Hospitality Sales and Marketing Association International (HSMAI)
- Hotel Management Society (HMS)
- Houston Spa Association—Student Chapter
- National Association of Catering and Events (NACE)
- National Society of Minorities in Hospitality—Cougar Chapter (NSMH-CC)
- Par Excellence
- Professional Convention Management Association (PCMA)
- Texas Restaurant Association Cougar Chapter (TRACC)
- Wine & Spirits Management Association (WSMA)
