= The Eva Gabor Show =

- Directed by: Various
- Presented by: Eva Gabor
- Country of origin: United States
- Original language: English
- No. of seasons: 1
- No. of episodes: Full season

Production
- Producer: Eva Gabor
- Running time: 15 minutes

The Eva Gabor Show is a talk show that aired in 1953–54. The show was hosted by and starred Eva Gabor. Gabor, an actress, had previously appeared on Broadway and in television shows. The Eva Gabor Show series aired for 15 minutes weekly and had different celebrity guests.
