= Hawley (surname) =

Hawley is a surname. Notable people with the surname include:

== A ==
- Adam Hawley, American musician
- Adelaide Hawley Cumming (1905–1998), American actress and radio host
- Alan Hawley (disambiguation), several people
- Alana Hawley Purvis, Canadian actress
- Alix Hawley (born 1975), Canadian author
- Allen Hawley (1893–1978), American fundraising administrator
- Amos Hawley (1910–2009), American sociologist
- Anne Hawley (born 1943), American museum director

== C ==
- Caleb Hawley, American Idol participant
- Cameron Hawley (1905–1969), American fiction writer
- Carl Tracy Hawley (1873–1945), American painter
- Caroline Hawley (born 1967), British journalist
- Charles Hawley (1792–1866), American politician
- Charles A. Hawley (1861–1929), American orthodontist
- Charles Beach Hawley, (1858–1915), American musician and composer
- Chuck Hawley (1915–1992), American baseball and basketball player
- Colin Hawley (born 1987), American rugby union player
- Cyrus M. Hawley (1815– 1894), American jurist

== D ==
- David Hawley (disambiguation), several people
- Dave Hawley, English guitarist
- Dominic Hawley, video director
- Donald Hawley (1921–2008), British lawyer and diplomat
- Donly C. Hawley (1855–1926), American politician and physician
- Dwight Hawley (1896–1981), American politician

== E ==
- Elizabeth Hawley (1923–2018), American journalist
- Elizabeth Hawley Everett (1857–1940), American suffragist and author
- Elizabeth Hawley Gasque (1886–1989), American politician
- Erin Hawley, American lawyer and activist

== F ==
- Florence M. Hawley (1901–1991), Mexican anthropologist
- Francis Hawley (disambiguation), several people
- Frank Hawley (born 1954), Canadian drag-racing driver
- Frank Hawley (cricketer) (1877–1913), English cricketer
- Fred Hawley (1890–1954), English footballer

== G ==
- George Douglas Hawley (1841–1934), Canadian politician
- Gideon Hawley (1727–1807), American missionary
- Graeme Hawley (born 1973), English actor

== H ==
- Henry Hawley (c. 1679–1759), British army officer
- Henry Hawley (colonial administrator) (fl.1630), British colonial administrator

== I ==
- Ida Hawley (1876–1908), Canadian actress and singer

== J ==
- Jack Hawley (1920–1999), American politician
- James Hawley (disambiguation), several people
- Jesse Hawley (disambiguation), several people
- Joe Hawley, American football player
- Joe Hawley (musician), American singer and musician
- John Hawley (disambiguation), several people
- Joseph Hawley (disambiguation), several people
- Josh Hawley (born 1979), American politician
- Josh Hawley (basketball player) (born 1996), American basketball player
- Judy Hawley, American politician

== K ==
- Karl Hawley (born 1981), English footballer
- Kate Hawley, New Zealand set and costume designer
- Katherine Hawley (1971–2021), British philosopher
- Ken Hawley (1927–2014), British tool specialist
- Kevin Hawley (born 1980), Anguillan footballer
- Kip Hawley (1953–2022), American businessman and administrator
- Kyle Hawley (born 2000), English footballer

== L ==
- Laura M. Thurston (née Hawley), American poet
- Lowell S. Hawley (1908–2003), American writer

== M ==
- Margaret Foote Hawley (1880–1963), American painter
- Marvin Hawley (1875–1904), American baseball player
- Michael Hawley (1961–2020), American artist and researcher in digital media
- Monte Hawley (died 1950), American actor

== N ==
- Nancy Miriam Hawley, American activist and feminist
- Nero Hawley (1742–1817), Colonial American soldier and slave
- Noah Hawley (born c. 1967), American director, producer, and writer

== O ==
- Ormi Hawley (1889–1942), American actress

== P ==
- Paul Ramsey Hawley (1891–1965), American physician and military officer
- Paul Hawley, drummer in Canadian rock band Hot Hot Heat
- Pink Hawley (1872–1938), American baseball player

== R ==
- R. Scott Hawley (1953–2025), American geneticist
- Richard Hawley (born 1967), English musician
- Richard Hawley (actor) (born 1955), English actor
- Richard E. Hawley (born 1942), American general
- Robert Hawley (1729–1799), Colonial American soldier
- Robert B. Hawley (1849–1921), American businessman and politician
- Rosemary Hawley Jarman (1935–2015), English fiction writer
- Ryan Hawley (born 1985), English actor

== S ==
- Sandy Hawley (born 1949), Canadian jockey
- Sid Hawley (1909–1971), English footballer
- Sophie Hawley-Weld (born 1992), American singer
- Spencer Hawley (born 1953), American politician
- Stanley Hawley (1867–1916), English pianist and composer
- Steve Hawley (disambiguation), several people (including Steven and Stephen)
- Suki Hawley (born 1969), American filmmaker
- Susan Hawley (1622–1706), English prioress

== T ==
- Thomas Hawley (disambiguation), several people
- Todd B. Hawley (1961–1995), American co-founder of the International Space University

== W ==
- Wanda Hawley (1895–1963), American actress
- Wilhelmina Douglas Hawley (1860–1958), American painter
- William Hawley (disambiguation), several people
- Willis C. Hawley (1864–1941), American politician
- Willis Nichols Hawley (1875–1898), American soldier

== By title ==
- General Hawley
- Justice Hawley
- Senator Hawley
