= Hawley =

Hawley may refer to:

== People ==
- Hawley Ades (1908–2008), American choral arranger
- Hawley Bennett-Awad (born 1977), Canadian Equestrian Team athletic
- Hawley Bowlus (1896–1967), American designer, engineer and builder
- Hawley Harvey Crippen (1862–1910), American homeopath, ear and eye specialist and medicine dispenser
- Hawley Olmstead (1793–1868), American politician and educator
- Hawley Pierce (1874–1969), American professional football player
- Hawley Pratt (1911–1999), American film director and animator
- Hawley Waterman (1930–2015), American sports coach and athletics administrator
- Huck Welch (1907–1979), Canadian football player
- Hawley (surname)

== Titles ==
- Baron Hawley
- Hawley baronets

== Places named Hawley ==
In Australia

- Hawley Beach, Tasmania

In the United Kingdom

- Hawley, Hampshire
- Hawley, Kent

In the United States

- Hawley, Idaho
- Hawley, Massachusetts
- Hawley, Minnesota
- Hawley, Missouri
- Hawley, Pennsylvania
- Hawley, Texas
- Hawleyville, Connecticut
- Ephraim Hawley House, Trumbull, Connecticut
- Gideon Hawley House, Barnstable, Massachusetts
- Octagon House (Barrington, Illinois), also known as Hawley House
- Thomas Hawley House, Monroe, Connecticut
- Hawley, fictional town in the film Jeremiah Johnson

== See also ==
- Haughley
- Justice Hawley (disambiguation)
- Senator Hawley (disambiguation)
