= Planned giving =

Charitable gift type

Planned giving (less commonly known as gift planning) is an area of fundraising that refers to several specific gift types that can be funded with cash, equity, or property. These gift vehicles are commonly based on United States tax law, but Canada, the United Kingdom, and other nations are beginning to establish similar laws. In the United States the specific rules of planned giving are defined by the United States Congress and the Internal Revenue Service.

== Education ==
The use of planned giving by colleges and universities was pioneered by Allen Hawley at Pomona College. In 1942, Hawley introduced what became known as the Pomona Plan, where members receive a lifetime annuity in exchange for donating to the college upon their death. The plan's model has since been adopted by many other institutions, although the annuity rates offered by Pomona remain among the highest.

== Types of planned gifts ==
- Charitable bargain sale
- Charitable Gift Annuity (CGA)
- Charitable Remainder Annuity Trust (CRAT)
- Charitable Remainder Unitrust (CRUT)
- Charitable remainder trust
- Charitable lead annuity trust
- Charitable lead trust
- bequest
- Donor Managed Investment Account
- Pooled income fund
- Retained life estate
- Testamentary life income

== Assets to give ==
- Securities
- Business Interests
- Cash
- Life insurance
- Personal property
- Real estate
- Retirement plan
