= LCMS Foundation =

Religious corporation

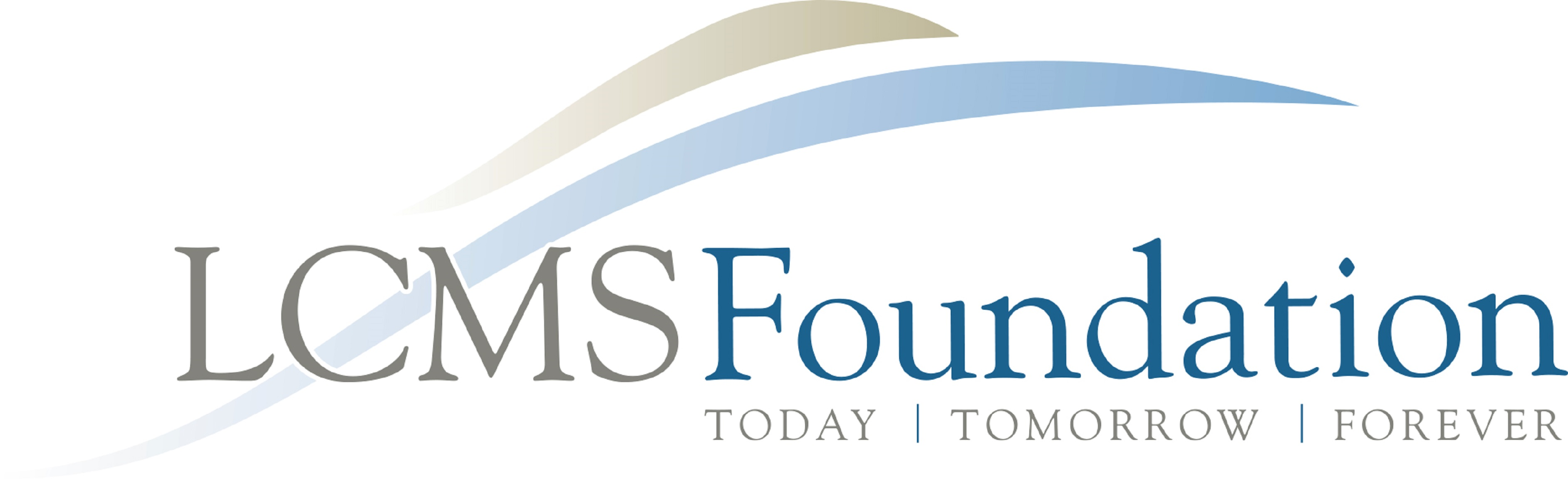
- Company type: Nonprofit
- Industry: Financial services
- Founded: 1958; 68 years ago
- Headquarters: St. Louis, Missouri, United States
- Area served: Worldwide
- Key people: David Fiedler (President)
- Products: Investment management, charitable gift annuities, trust funds, bequests, endowments, donor-advised fund, pooled income fund
- AUM: US $956.0 million
- Total assets: (2017)
- Number of employees: 51 (2017)
- Website: lcmsfoundation.org

The Lutheran Church – Missouri Synod Foundation is the investment and trust administration corporation for the Lutheran Church – Missouri Synod (LCMS). The LCMS Foundation serves the LCMS, the Concordia University System, and the congregations, schools, seminaries, districts, Recognized Service Organizations, and other affiliated service organizations of the LCMS.

In its role of supporting the LCMS, the LCMS Foundation provides investment management services and donor counseling for bequests, endowments, charitable gift annuities, donor advised funds, and other charitable trust funds.

== History ==
The LCMS Foundation was established on December 8, 1958, to receive gifts of property and other non-cash assets on behalf of the LCMS. The foundation was led by Rev. E. R. Bertermann, who served as its first executive director. At first, the foundation received subsidies from the LCMS. The foundation became self-sustaining in 1968.

Beginning in 1979, the LCMS Foundation assisted in raising direct gifts to purchase property and construction of a new headquarters for the LCMS. This building, located in Kirkwood, Missouri, is known as the LCMS International Center.

The 1981 LCMS Convention created the position of president to oversee the LCMS Foundation. The foundation president also served as vice–president, finance/treasurer of the LCMS. Norm Sell jointly held all of these positions until 1992, when the positions were split as a result of the 1992 Synod convention.

In 2001, the foundation switched from managing its own investments to employing Wilshire Associates to assist in locating outside fund managers to do the investing.

From 2000 to 2013 the LCMS Foundation provided development services to the LCMS, KFUO Radio, LCMS Joint Seminary Fund, LCMS World Mission, LCMS World Relief and Human Care, Lutheran Housing Support, and the Concordia University System. Since 2013, all direct gift fund raising activity has been handled directly by the LCMS.

== Supporting ministries ==
Since the LCMS Foundation was established in 1958, it has distributed more than $1.3 billion in gifts. In fiscal year 2025, the LCMS Foundation distributed $41.9 million to nearly 1,000 ministries, including congregations, schools, seminaries, and other ministry organizations named by donors. That same year, it also helped donors create new gift plans totaling approximately $175 million in additional future gifts.

The LCMS Foundation also provides development training courses for LCMS ministries to create charitable planned gifts. Successful completion of the courses provides participants with certification in Gift Development and Stewardship for Christian nonprofit organizations.
