= South Dakota's 7th legislative district =

American legislative district

South Dakota's 7th State Senate district

South Dakota's 7th legislative district is one of 35 districts in the South Dakota Legislature. Each district is represented by 1 senator and 2 representatives. In the Senate, it has been represented by Republican Tim Reed since 2023. In the House, it has been represented by Republicans Mellissa Heermann and Roger DeGroot since 2023.

== Geography ==
The district is based in and around Brookings, the state's fourth-largest city, in eastern South Dakota.

== Recent elections ==
South Dakota legislators are elected to two-year terms, with each permitted to serve a maximum of four consecutive two-year terms. Elections are held every even-numbered year.

=== State senate elections ===
Year	Incumbent	Party	First elected	Result	General election	Primary elections
2022	V. J. Smith	Republican	2018	Incumbent retired. Republican hold.	▌ ✓ Tim Reed (Republican) 100%	Republican: ▌ ✓ Tim Reed (inc.) 60.2%; ▌ Julie Erickson 39.8%
2020	V. J. Smith	Republican	2018	Incumbent re-elected.	▌ ✓ V. J. Smith (Republican) 100%	
2018	Larry Tidemann	Republican	2010	Incumbent retired. Republican hold.	▌ ✓ V. J. Smith (Republican) 61.2%; ▌ Mary Perpich (Independent) 38.8%	
2016	Larry Tidemann	Republican	2010	Incumbent re-elected.	▌ ✓ Larry Tidemann (Republican) 65.9%; ▌ Mary Perpich (Democratic) 34.1%	Republican: ▌ ✓ Larry Tidemann (inc.) 59.5%; ▌ Doug Post 40.5%
2014	Larry Tidemann	Republican	2010	Incumbent re-elected.	▌ ✓ Larry Tidemann (Republican) 62.7%; ▌ Jay Vanduch (Democratic) 37.3%	
2012	Larry Tidemann	Republican	2010	Incumbent re-elected.	▌ ✓ Larry Tidemann (Republican) 53.5%; ▌ Pamela Merchant (Democratic) 46.5%	
