= List of United States post office murals in Florida =

This is a List of United States post office murals in Florida.

Location	Mural title	Image	Artist	Date	Notes	NRHP listed
De Funiak Springs	Scene of Town		Thomas I. Laughlin	1942	oil on canvas	
Fort Pierce	Osceola Holding Informal Court with His Chiefs		Lucile Blanch	1938	oil on canvas, on display at Fort Pierce City Hall	
Jasper	Harvest at Home		Pietro Lazzari	1941	fresco	
Jasper	News from Afar		Pietro Lazzari	1941	fresco	
Lake Wales	Harvest Time – Lake Wales		Denman Fink	1942		
Lake Worth	Settlers Fighting Alligator from Rowboat		Joseph D. Meyers	1947		
Madison	Long Staple Cotton		George Snow Hill	1937	oil on canvas	
Miami	Law Guides Florida Progress		Denman Fink	1940	oil on canvas	
Miami Beach	Episodes from the History of Florida: Discover		Charles Russell Hardman	1940	oil on canvas, three panels	
Miami Beach	Episodes from the History of Florida: De Soto and the Indians		Charles Russell Hardman	1940	oil on canvas, three panels	
Miami Beach	Episodes from the History of Florida: Conference		Charles Russell Hardman	1940	oil on canvas, three panels	
Milton	Loading Pulpwood		George Snow Hill	1941	oil on canvas	
Palm Beach	Landscape		Charles Rosen	1938	oil on canvas	
Palm Beach	Seminole Indians		Charles Rosen	1938	oil on canvas	1983
Perry	Cypress Logging		George Snow Hill	1938	Moved in 1987 from the Old Perry Post Office to a new post office building; a photographic reproduction was to be posted in the original location	
Sebring	Prehistoric Life in Florida		Charles R. Knight	1942	oil on canvas, on display at the Sebring Public Library	
Starke	Reforestation		Elizabeth Terrell	1942		
Tallahassee	History of Florida		Eduard Buk Ulreich	1939	oil on canvas, eight panels	
West Palm Beach	The Legend of James Edward Hamilton, Mail Carrier		Stevan Dohanos	1940	tempera, six panels	
