= CRAT =

CRAT or Crat may refer to:

- CRAT (gene), a human gene
- Bureaucrat
- Charitable Remainder Annuity Trust
