= Charitable trust =

Irrevocable trust established for charitable purposes

A charitable trust is an irrevocable trust established for charitable purposes. In some jurisdictions, it is a more specific term than "charitable organization". A charitable trust enjoys varying degrees of tax benefits in most countries and also generates goodwill. Some important terminology in charitable trusts includes the term "corpus" (Latin for "body"), referring to the assets with which the trust is funded, and the term "donor," which is the person donating assets to a charity.

== India ==
In India, trusts set up for social causes and approved by the Income Tax Department not only receive exemption from tax payment, but donors to such trusts can also deduct the donated amount from their taxable income. The legal framework in India recognizes activities such as "relief of the poor, education, medical relief, preservation of monuments and the environment, and the advancement of any other object of general public utility" as charitable purposes. Companies formed under Section 8 of the Companies Act, 2013, for promoting charity, also receive benefits under the law, including exemption from various procedural provisions of the Companies Act—either fully or partially—and are entitled to other exemptions that the Central Government may grant through its orders.

== Iran ==
In the Islamic Republic of Iran, religious charitable trusts, or bonyads, constitute a substantial part of the country's economy, controlling an estimated 20% of Iran's GDP. Unlike some other Muslim-majority countries, the bonyads receive large and controversial subsidies from the Iranian government.

== United Kingdom ==
In England and Wales, charitable trusts represent a form of express trust dedicated to charitable goals. There are several advantages to charitable trust status, including exemption from most forms of taxation and freedom for the trustees that is not found in other types of English trusts. For a charitable trust to be considered valid, the organization must demonstrate both a charitable purpose and a public benefit. Applicable charitable purposes are typically divided into four categories: trusts for relieving poverty, trusts for promoting education, trusts for advancing religion, and all other types of trusts recognized by the law. This also includes trusts for the benefit of animals and trusts for the benefit of a locality. Additionally, there is a requirement that the trust's purposes benefit the public or a specific section of the public, rather than merely a group of private individuals.

Several circumstances render such trusts invalid. Charitable trusts are prohibited from operating for profit, and their purposes cannot be non-charitable unless these purposes are ancillary to the charitable goal. Furthermore, it is deemed unacceptable for charitable trusts to engage in campaigns for political or legal change. However, discussing political issues in a neutral manner is permissible. Charitable trusts, like other trusts, are administered by trustees, but there is no direct relationship between the trustees and the beneficiaries. This results in two key points: first, the trustees of a charitable trust have greater freedom to act than other trustees, and secondly, beneficiaries cannot take legal action against the trustees. Instead, the beneficiaries are represented by the Attorney General for England and Wales in their capacity as parens patriae, appearing on behalf of The Crown.

The jurisdiction over charitable disputes is equally shared between the High Court of Justice and the Charity Commission. The Commission, being the primary authority, is responsible for regulating and promoting charitable trusts. It also provides advice and opinions to trustees on administrative matters. In cases where the Commission detects mismanagement or maladministration, it has the authority to take actions against the trustees. This includes their removal, the appointment of new trustees, or even temporarily assuming control of the trust property to prevent harm. In instances where there are issues with a charity, the High Court can implement schemes that dictate the functioning of the charity.

== United States ==
In the United States, many individuals use charitable trusts to leave all or a portion of their estate to charity when they die, both for philanthropic purposes and for certain tax benefits. Charitable trusts can be set up inter vivos (during a donor's life) or as a part of a trust or will at death (testamentary). There are two basic types of US charitable trusts: charitable remainder trusts (CRT) and charitable lead trusts (CLT). Additionally, there is an Optimized Charitable Lead Annuity Trust (OCLAT) designed to maximize the tax and economic benefits for the contributor.

Charitable remainder trusts are irrevocable structures established by a donor to provide an income stream to the income beneficiary, while the public charity or private foundation receives the remainder value when the trust terminates. These "split interest" trusts are defined in §664 of the Internal Revenue Code and are normally tax-exempt. A Section 664 trust makes payments either of a fixed amount (charitable remainder annuity trust) or a percentage of trust principal (charitable remainder unitrust), to either the donor or another named beneficiary. If the trust qualifies under the IRS code, the donor may claim a charitable income tax deduction for their donation to the trust. Moreover, the donor might not need to pay an immediate capital gains tax when the trust disposes of the appreciated asset and purchases other income-generating assets to fund the trust. At the end of the trust term, which may be based on either lives or a term of years, the charity receives whatever amount is left in the trust. Charitable remainder unitrusts provide flexibility in the distribution of income and may be helpful in retirement planning, while charitable remainder annuity trusts paying a fixed dollar amount are more rigid and typically appeal to much older donors unconcerned about inflation's impact on income distributions, and who are using cash or marketable securities to fund the trust. In some situations, the less complicated pooled income fund may be more suitable than the charitable remainder trusts.

Charitable lead trusts are the opposite of charitable remainder trusts and make payments to charity for the term of the trust. Similar to a charitable remainder trust, payments may be either a fixed amount (charitable lead annuity trust) or a percentage of trust principal (charitable lead unitrust). At the end of the trust term, the remainder can either go back to the donor or to heirs named by the donor. The donor may sometimes claim a charitable income tax deduction or a gift/estate tax deduction for making a lead trust gift, depending on the type of charitable lead trust. Generally, a non-grantor lead trust does not generate a current income tax deduction, but it eliminates the asset (or part of the asset's value) from the donor's estate.

== See also ==
- Charitable organization
- Coproduction of public services by service users and communities
- Foundation (nonprofit organization)
- Waqf, Islamic charitable endowment

== Sources ==
- Dollimore, Jean (2007). "The Charities Act 2006: Part 1". Private Client Business. 2007 (2). Sweet & Maxwell. ISSN 0967-229X.
- Edwards, Richard; Nigel Stockwell (2007). Trusts and Equity (8th ed.). Pearson Longman. ISBN 978-1-4058-4684-4.
- Hudson, Alastair (2009). Equity and Trusts (6th ed.). Routledge-Cavendish. ISBN 978-0-415-49771-8.
