= Spencer Hawley =

American politician

Minority Leader of the South Dakota House of Representatives
- In office January 13, 2015 – January 10, 2019
- Preceded by: Bernie Hunhoff
- Succeeded by: Jamie Smith

Member of the South Dakota House of Representatives from the 7th district
- In office January 11, 2011 – January 10, 2019 Serving with Scott Munsterman, Tim Reed
- Preceded by: ???
- Succeeded by: Doug Post

Personal details
- Born: April 18, 1953 (age 73) Armour, South Dakota, U.S.
- Party: Democratic
- Education: South Dakota State University

Spencer LeRoy Hawley (born April 18, 1953) is an American politician and a Democratic former member of the South Dakota House of Representatives representing District 7 from 2011 to 2019.

== Elections ==
- 2012 Hawley and another candidate ran unopposed in the June 5, 2012 Democratic Primary; in the four-way November 6, 2012 General election incumbent Republican Representative Scott Munsterman took the first seat and Hawley took the second seat with 4,610 votes (31.34%) ahead of fellow Democratic nominee Linda Brandt and Republican nominee Brian Roehrich.
- 2010 When incumbent Republican Representative Larry Tidemann ran for South Dakota Senate and Representative Carol Pitts left the Legislature leaving both District 7 seats open, Hawley ran in the three-way June 8, 2010 Democratic Primary and placed first with 465 votes (51.16%). In the four-way November 2, 2010 General election Republican nominee Scott Munsterman took the first seat and Hawley took the second seat with 4,038 votes (28.22%) ahead of Republican nominee Michael Bartley and Democratic nominee Harold Widvey, who had run for Senate in 2006.

South Dakota House of Representatives
Preceded by Bernie Hunhoff	Minority Leader of the South Dakota House of Representatives; 2015–2019	Succeeded by Jamie Smith
