= Doug Post =

American politician

Member of the South Dakota House of Representatives from the 7th district
- In office 2019–2021
- Preceded by: Spencer Hawley
- Succeeded by: Larry Tidemann

Personal details
- Party: Republican
- Spouse: Ginger
- Children: 3
- Education: South Dakota State University
- Occupation: Dairy Farmer

Doug Post is an American politician. He is a Republican who represented the 7th district in the South Dakota House of Representatives from 2019 to 2021.

== Political career ==
In 2016, Post ran to represent District 7 in the South Dakota State Senate, but lost the Republican primary to Larry Tidemann.

In 2018, Post ran for one of District 7's two seats in the South Dakota House of Representatives. He and fellow Republican Tim Reed won in a five-way race with two Democrats and one independent candidate.

In 2020, Post ran for re-election, but lost in the Republican primary.

=== Electoral record ===
2016 Republican primary: South Dakota State Senate, District 7
Party	Candidate	Votes	%
Republican	Larry Tidemann	713	59.47%
Republican	Doug Post	486	40.53%

2018 general election: South Dakota House of Representatives, District 7
Party	Candidate	Votes	%
Republican	Tim Reed	4,593	32.9%
Republican	Doug Post	3,132	22.5%
Democratic	Dwight Adamson	2,468	17.7%
Independent	Cory Ann Ellis	1,976	1.42%
Democratic	Zachary Kovach	1,780	12.8%

2020 Republican primary: South Dakota House of Representatives, District 7
Party	Candidate	Votes	%
Republican	Tim Reed	1,205	40.9%
Republican	Larry Tidemann	977	33.2%
Republican	Doug Post	764	25.9%
