= CRUT =

CRUT may refer to:

- Charitable remainder unitrust
- Comprehensive Region Urban Transport, a public transit agency in Odisha, India
