= Polly Hill =

Polly Hill may refer to:

- Polly Hill (economist) (1914–2005), British economic historian
- Polly Hill (horticulturist) (1907–2007), American horticulturist
- Polly Knipp Hill (1900–1990), American artist
