= Ryan Guillen =

American politician from Texas (born 1977)

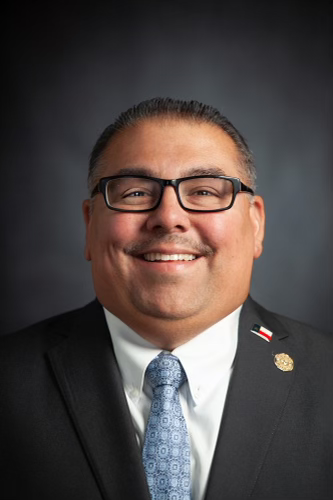
- Official portrait, 2025

Member of the Texas House of Representatives from the 31st district
- Incumbent
- Assumed office January 14, 2003
- Preceded by: Judy Hawley

Personal details
- Born: Ryan Anthony Guillen; October 27, 1977 (age 48) Bryan, Texas, U.S.
- Party: Democratic (before 2021); Republican (2021–present)
- Spouse: Dalinda
- Children: 2
- Education: Texas A&M University (BS)
- Website: Office website Campaign website

Ryan Anthony Guillen (born October 27, 1977) is an American politician serving as the Texas State Representative for House District 31, which includes Starr, Wilson, Karnes, Duval, Brooks, Jim Hogg, Kenedy, La Salle, Live Oak, McMullen and Zapata counties.

== Early life and education ==
Guillen grew up working at his family's feed store and farm. He went on to receive an Bachelor of Science in agriculture from Texas A&M University and briefly teach high school agriculture before pursuing public office.

== Texas Legislature ==
Guillen was first elected in 2002 at the age of 24, making him one of the youngest ever elected to the Texas House of Representatives. He has served in continuous consecutive sessions of the Texas Legislature since he first took office in January 2003.

=== Change to Party Affiliation ===
Guillen was first elected as, and served nine terms as, a Democrat. During that time, he often voted with his Republican colleagues on core conservative social issues such as gun control and abortion rights. In November 2021, Guillen announced he was switching parties, a move that strengthened the Republican majority in the Texas statehouse.

=== Committee appointments and leadership ===
Guillen has been appointed to multiple standing, select and interim committees throughout his tenure in the Texas House, and has been appointed as chair or vice-chair under four different speaker administrations:

89th Legislature: Agriculture & Livestock (Chair); Redistricting; State Affairs

88th Legislature: Homeland Security and Public Safety (Chair); State Affairs; Select, Community Safety (Chair)

87th Legislature: Agriculture & Livestock; Licensing and Administrative Procedures; Redistricting; Resolutions Calendars (Chair)

86th Legislature: Licensing and Administrative Procedures; Resolutions Calendars (Chair), Ways and Means (Vice Chair)

85th Legislature: Licensing and Administrative Procedures (Vice Chair); State Affairs

84th Legislature: Culture, Recreation, and Tourism (Chair); Licensing and Administrative Procedures

83rd Legislature: Culture, Recreation, and Tourism (Chair); Licensing and Administrative Procedures; Study Water Desalination (Joint Interim)

82nd Legislature: Cruise Industry Development; Culture, Recreation, and Tourism (Chair); Election Contest District 48, Select; Public Education; Public School Finance System; Oversight of Windstorm Insurance

81st Legislature: Border and Intergovernmental Affairs; Oversight of Windstorm Insurance; Transportation; Transportation Funding, Select (Chair, Subcommittee on Planning and Accountability)

80th Legislature: Appropriations (Vice Chair); Calendars; Higher and Public Education Finance, Select; Natural Resources

79th Legislature: Appropriations; Appropriations Subcommittee on Education; Election Contests, Select; Financial Institutions (Budget and Oversight Chair)

78th Legislature: Election Contests, Select; Land and Resource Management; Regulated Industries

== Election history ==
General Election 2024: HD 31

Candidate	Votes	%
Ryan Guillen	50,653	100
No Opponent	--	--

General Election 2022: HD 31

Candidate	Votes	%
Ryan Guillen	34,806	71.24
Martha M. Gutierrez	14,054	28.76

Republican Primary Election 2022: HD 31

Candidate	Votes	%
Ryan Guillen	7,544	56.64
Alena Berlanga	1,237	9.29
Mike Monreal	4,539	34.08

General Election 2020: HD 31

Candidate	Votes	%
Ryan Guillen	32,235	58.41
Marian Knowlton	22,950	41.59

General Election 2018: HD 31

Candidate	Votes	%
Ryan Guillen	27,492	100
No Opponent	--	--

Democratic Primary Election 2018: HD 31

Candidate	Votes	%
Ryan Guillen	14,268	55.39
Ana Lisa Garza	11,491	44.61

General Election 2016: HD 31

Candidate	Votes	%
Ryan Guillen	30,829	100
No Opponent	--	--

General Election 2014: HD 31

Candidate	Votes	%
Ryan Guillen	16,396	100
No Opponent	--	--

General Election 2012: HD 31

Candidate	Votes	%
Ryan Guillen	27,856	66.3
Ann Matthews	14,163	33.7

General Election 2010: HD 31

Candidate	Votes	%
Ryan Guillen	12,724	100
No Opponent	--	--

General Election 2008: HD 31

Candidate	Votes	%
Ryan Guillen	24,170	100
No Opponent	--	--

General Election 2006: HD 31

Candidate	Votes	%
Ryan Guillen	12,711	100
No Opponent	--	--

General Election 2004: HD 31

Candidate	Votes	%
Ryan Guillen	20,052	100
No Opponent	--	--

General Election 2002: HD 31

Candidate	Votes	%
Ryan Guillen	16,665	100
No Opponent	--	--

Democratic Primary Runoff Election 2002: HD 31

Candidate	Votes	%
Ryan Guillen	8,162	61.32
Adolfo Campero	5,148	38.68

Democratic Primary Election 2002: HD 31

Candidate	Votes	%
Ryan Guillen	9,246	38.75
Adolfo Campero	7,608	31.74
Ignacio Salinas	7,115	29.68
