= V. J. Smith =

American politician, author, and motivational speaker

Member of the South Dakota Senate from the 7th district
- In office January 8, 2019 – January 10, 2023
- Preceded by: Larry Tidemann
- Succeeded by: Tim Reed

Personal details
- Party: Republican
- Education: South Dakota State University

V. J. Smith is an American politician, author, and motivational speaker. He served as a member of the South Dakota Senate from the 7th district for two terms as a Republican from 2019 to 2023.

== Background ==
One of four siblings, Smith was raised in South Dakota. He graduated from South Dakota State University in 1978.

After earning his bachelor's degree, he worked for AlliedSignal Aerospace Company in Kansas City, Missouri during the 1980s. In 1990, he returned to South Dakota State University to serve as the assistant athletic director. He served as the executive director of the SDSU Alumni Association from 1996 to 2007, resigning to pursue a career as a full-time public speaker. Smith is also the author of several books, including The Richest Man in Town, the biography of a Walmart employee in Brookings, South Dakota. As a public speaker, Smith frequently tours the United States to perform speeches at schools.
