= Roger DeGroot =

American politician

Member of the South Dakota House of Representatives from the 7th district
- Incumbent
- Assumed office January 10, 2023 Serving with Mellissa Heermann

Personal details
- Born: February 11, 1952 (age 74)
- Party: Republican
- Education: University of South Dakota (EdD)

Roger DeGroot (born February 11, 1952) is an American politician. He is a member of the South Dakota House of Representatives from the 7th district, alongside Mellissa Heermann. He is a member of the Republican Party.
