= Senator Hale =

Senator Hale may refer to:

== Members of the United States Senate ==
- Eugene Hale (1836–1918), U.S. Senator from Maine from 1881 to 1911
- Frederick Hale (U.S. senator) (1874–1963), U.S. Senator from Maine from 1917 to 1941
- John P. Hale (1806–1873), U.S. Senator from New Hampshire

== United States state senate members ==
- Albert Hale (1950–2021), Arizona Senate
- Artemas Hale (1783–1882), Massachusetts Senate
- Charles Hale (1831–1882), Massachusetts Senate
- Franklin D. Hale (1854–1940), Vermont Senate
- John K. Hale (New York politician) (1807–1879), New York State Senate
- John K. Hale (Iowa politician) (1858–1946), Iowa Senate
- Karen Hale (born 1958), Utah Senate
- Matthew Hale (New York politician) (1829–1897), New York State Senate
- Nathan W. Hale (1860–1941), Tennessee Senate
- Pat Hale (1937–2025), Washington State Senate
- Steve Hale (politician) (born 1954), Mississippi State Senate
- William Hale (Michigan politician) (1809–1874), Michigan State Senate
- William Hale (New Hampshire politician) (1765–1848), New Hampshire Senate

== See also ==
- Senator Haile (disambiguation)
- Senator Haley (disambiguation)
