= Pam Cole =

American politician

Pamela Merchant Cole

Member of the South Dakota Senate from the 7th district
- In office 2009–2011
- Preceded by: Orville B. Smidt
- Succeeded by: Larry Tidemann

Personal details
- Born: Pamela Merchant; December 18, 1967 (age 58) Walhalla, North Dakota
- Party: Democratic
- Education: Rocky Mountain College of Art and Design; South Dakota State University
- Profession: Graphic designer

Pamela Merchant Cole (born December 18, 1967) is a graphic designer and former Democratic member of the South Dakota Senate who represented the 7th district from 2009 to 2011. She was also the executive director of the South Dakota Democratic Party from 2020 to 2021.

== Career ==
Cole was elected to the 7th district state senate seat in the 2008 election, beating Republican Orville B. Smidt. She served on the Commerce Committee, the Health and Human Service Committee and the Taxation Committee. She lost her seat at the 2010 election, being beaten by Larry Tidemann.

In 2016, she moved from Brookings to Sioux Falls. She was made the executive director of the South Dakota Democratic Party in February 2020, after the party leadership had resigned due to the party misstating its finances and finding itself in debt. In September 2020, Cole announced that the party had been "extremely frugal" in its recent spending and was once again financially stable. She resigned in February 2021 for personal reasons.

In 2022, Cole filed to run for the at-large B seat on Sioux Falls city council as incumbent Christine Erickson was term limited. She lost to Rich Merkouris, a local pastor.

== Electoral history ==
=== 2008 ===
2008 South Dakota Senate election: District 7 Democratic primary
Party	Candidate	Votes	%
Democratic	Pam Merchant	1,128	52.03
Democratic	Craig A. Tschetter	1,040	47.97
Total votes		2,168	100.0

2008 South Dakota Senate election: District 7 general election
Party	Candidate	Votes	%
Democratic	Pam Merchant	4,940	51.16
Republican	Orville B. Smidt	4,716	48.84
Total votes		9,656	100.00
Democratic gain from Republican			

=== 2010 ===
2010 South Dakota Senate election: District 7 general election
Party	Candidate	Votes	%
Republican	Larry Tidemann	4,289	54.15
Democratic	Pam Merchant	3,631	45.85
Total votes		7,920	100.00
Republican gain from Democratic			

=== 2022 ===
2022 Sioux Falls City Council election: At-large district B general election (Note: Candidates for Sioux Falls City Council must run without a party designation.)
Party	Candidate	Votes	%
no description	Rich Merkouris	14,493	56.99
no description	Pam Cole	10,936	43.01
Total votes		25,429	100.00

== Personal life ==
Cole married her husband Mike in 2018 and together they have a blended family of five adult children.
