= Old Perry Post Office =

- U.S. National Register of Historic Places
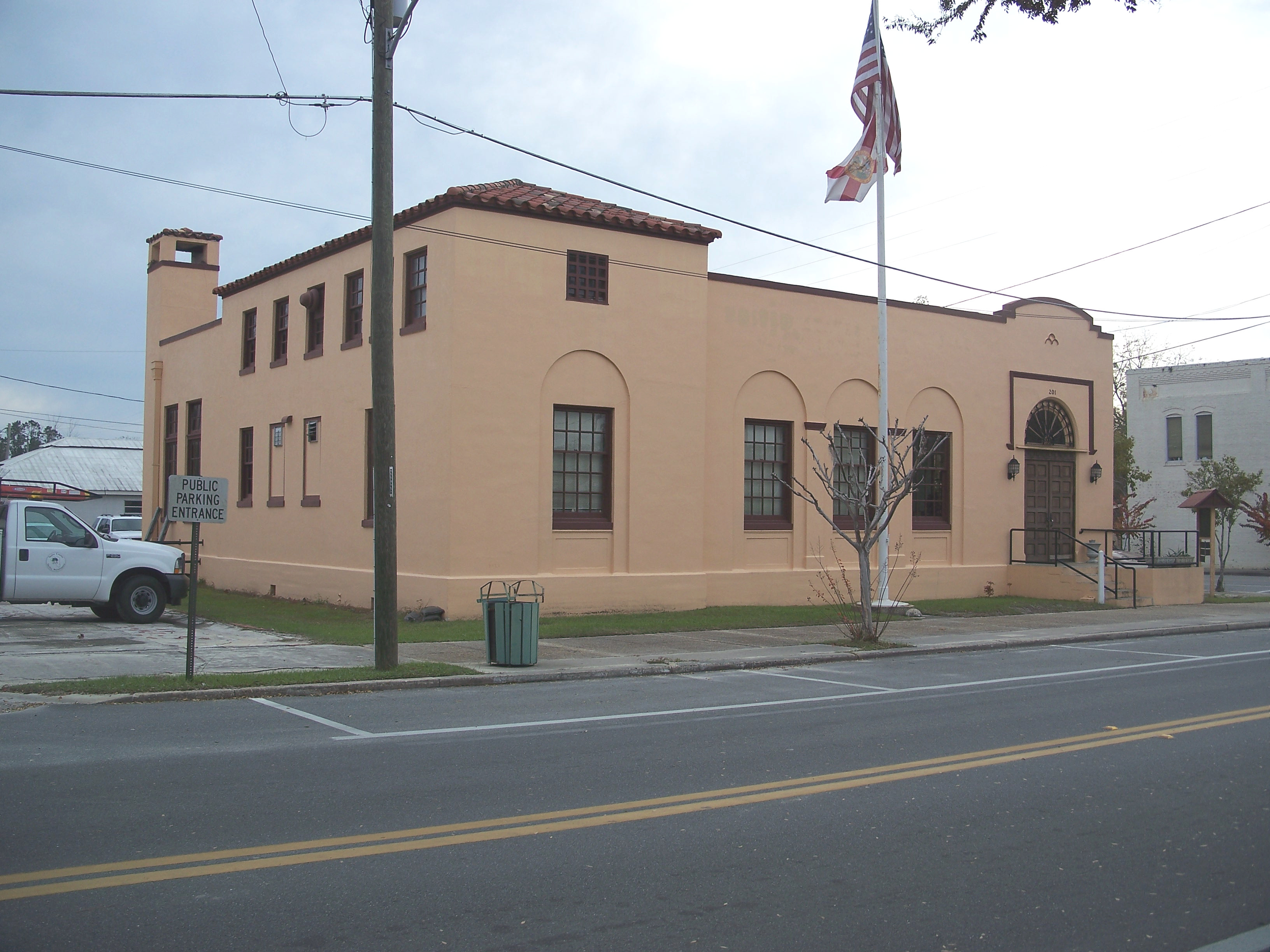

- Location within Florida Location within the United States
- Location: 201 E. Green St., Perry, Florida
- Coordinates: 30°7′1.67″N 83°34′52″W
- Area: less than one acre
- Built: 1935
- Architectural style: Frame Vernacular with Mediterranean Revival elements
- NRHP reference No.: 89000404
- Added to NRHP: May 11, 1989

The Old Perry Post Office is a historic site in Perry, Florida, located at 201 East Green Street. On May 11, 1989, it was added to the U.S. National Register of Historic Places.

The post office was built in 1935. It is a one-story-with-mezzanine structure which is vernacular in style but with modest elements of Mediterranean Revival.

The building included a publicly funded mural installed in 1938. The mural is a panel painted by George Snow Hill (1898–1969) which is titled "Cypress Logging", depicting the lumber industry of the area. (See #14 in accompanying photos.) The panel was moved to a new site, the new Perry Post Office, in 1987. A photographic reproduction of the mural was to be posted in the Old Perry Post Office, as of the NRHP listing.

== See also ==
- List of United States post offices
