= Mellissa Heermann =

American politician (born 1978)

Member of the South Dakota House of Representatives from the 7th district
- Incumbent
- Assumed office January 10, 2023 Serving with Roger DeGroot

Personal details
- Born: December 5, 1978 (age 47)
- Party: Republican
- Education: University of Nebraska–Lincoln (BA); South Dakota State University (MA)

Mellissa Heermann is an American politician. She is serving as a member of the South Dakota House of Representatives from the 7th district, alongside Roger DeGroot. She is a member of the Republican Party.

Heermann previously served as the mayor of Lake Preston, South Dakota, as well as a member of the Lake Preston city council and the Brookings, South Dakota school board.
