= Polly Knipp Hill =

American artist

Pauline Knipp Hill (2 April 1900-22 February 1990) was an American artist from Ithaca, New York. Her work was shown 7 April 2012 – 3 June 2012 at the Georgia Museum of Art in Athens, Georgia. She grew up in Urbana, Illinois.

Knipp and George Snow Hill were students of Carl Tracy Hawley in the College of Fine Arts at the Syracuse University. She followed Hill to Paris, France after graduation and they were married on 16 November 1925, in St. Luke's Chapel.

She produced etchings of European architecture early in her career and "satirical genre scenes that reflected American culture" later. Her work was part of the painting event in the art competition at the 1932 Summer Olympics.

She died in 1990 in St. Petersburg, Florida. The estate and several of her and her husband's works were sold off after the death of their son George Jr. Myers Fine Art and Auction House purchased George Snow Hill's in 1990.
