= Thomas Hawley =

Thomas Hawley may refer to:

- Thomas Hawley (officer of arms) (died 1557), officer of arms at the College of Arms in London
- Thomas E. Hawley, acting United States Under Secretary of the Army, 2015
- Thomas Porter Hawley (1830–1907), United States federal judge
- Thomas Hawley (MP) for Lincolnshire (UK Parliament constituency)
- Thomas Hawley House, a historic Colonial American wooden post-and-beam saltbox farm house built in 1755 in Monroe, Connecticut
- Thomas Hawley, namesake of Hawley, Minnesota
- Thomas Hawley (priest), clergyman in the Church of Ireland
