= Senator Hailey =

Senator Hailey may refer to:

- Evelyn Momsen Hailey (1921–2011), Virginia State Senate
- O. E. Hailey (1870–1958), Idaho State Senate

== See also ==
- Senator Haile (disambiguation)
- Senator Haley (disambiguation)
