= Carol Pitts =

American politician

Member of the South Dakota House of Representatives from the 7th district
- In office January 9, 2007 – January 11, 2011
- Preceded by: Sean O'Brien
- Succeeded by: Spencer Hawley; Scott Munsterman
- In office January 9, 2001 – July 31, 2002
- Preceded by: Robert Roe
- Succeeded by: Sean O'Brien

Personal details
- Born: January 26, 1950 (age 76) Flandreau, South Dakota
- Party: Republican

Carol Pitts (born January 26, 1950) is an American politician who served in the South Dakota House of Representatives from the 7th district from 2001 to 2002 and from 2007 to 2011.
