= David Hawley (disambiguation) =

David or Dave Hawley may refer to:

- Dave Hawley, Sheffield guitarist, father of Richard Hawley
- Dave Hawley, actor, known for Les Misérables (2012), Fish Tank (2009) and Shiner (2014).
- David Hawley (1741–1807), American Navy captain
- David Hawley (rugby league), rugby league player in the 1960s and 1970s
- David Hawley, actor in Ex on the Beach
