= Hopkins School =

Prep school in New Haven, Connecticut, US

Location
- 986 Forest Road; New Haven, Connecticut 06515; United States; 41°19′11″N 72°58′21″W

Information
- Type: Private, Day school
- Motto: Quod felix faustumque sit ("May it be prosperous and happy")
- Established: 1660 (366 years ago)
- Founder: John Davenport
- Area trustee: Gwen Evans
- School code: 070490
- CEEB code: 070490
- Head of school: Matt Glendinning
- Faculty: 130
- Grades: 7-12
- Gender: Co-educational (since 1972)
- Enrollment: 714
- Average class size: 12
- Student to teacher ratio: 5:1
- Campus size: 108 acres (44 ha)
- Campus type: Suburban
- Colors: Maroon and Gray
- Athletics conference: NEPSAC, Fairchester Athletic Association (FAA)
- Mascot: The Hilltopper
- Rival: Hamden Hall Country Day School
- Accreditation: New England Association of Schools and Colleges (NEASC)
- Publication: Daystar (literary magazine)
- Newspaper: The Razor; The Hilltopper
- Yearbook: Per Annos
- Endowment: $193M (USD)
- Tuition: $50,850 (USD)
- Website: www.hopkins.edu

Hopkins School is a private, college-preparatory, coeducational, day school for grades 7–12 located in New Haven, Connecticut.

In 1660, Edward Hopkins, seven-time governor of the Connecticut Colony, bequeathed a portion of his estate to found schools dedicated to "the breeding up of hopeful youths." With a portion of the bequest, Hopkins Grammar School was founded in a one-room building on the New Haven Green. The school relocated to its current campus in 1926. Hopkins has been coeducational since merging with Day Prospect Hill School in 1972.

== History ==
=== Founding ===
John Davenport, a founder of the New Haven Colony, was an early proponent of education in the colony. Grammar schools of the time generally prepared young men for college, but the Puritan colony was too far from England for its citizens to attend the existing English schools. Parents of the time were generally more concerned with spending their money on essentials such as food, and viewed formal education as an extravagance most could not afford. Davenport enlisted the help of a friend, Edward Hopkins, governor of the Connecticut Colony, to found a traditional grammar school that would teach Latin, Greek, and Hebrew grammar. The school's first home was a building on the New Haven Green.

The original Hopkins School coat of arms was designed by Edward Hopkins to be a personal symbol, though it was not an official piece of heraldry.

Hopkins died in 1657 and bequeathed money to found a school dedicated to "the breeding up of hopeful youths for the public service of the country in future times." Colonial officials wanted Hopkins's bequest to remain in Connecticut and appointed three men, Davenport and two others, as executors of Hopkins's will. They created the Hopkins Fund, from which Hopkins Grammar School was established in 1660.

The exact date of Hopkins School's founding is a matter of definition. The historical record of the executors' report implies the trust was created on May 4, 1660, but since the Julian calendar was in use then, the date corresponds to May 14 on modern calendars. The papers that created the fund were presented and accepted on May 30, and many use this date as the official date of the school's founding. Finally, on June 4 (June 14 on modern calendars) Davenport transferred control of the bequest to the colony, on the condition that the colony accept responsibility for the support of the school.

=== The Fallow Years ===
"The Fallow Years" is a term coined by Thomas B. Davis in his history, Chronicles of Hopkins Grammar School, to describe the period from 1696 to 1853. During this time the school had difficulty finding qualified schoolmasters, and the Hopkins Fund often fell short in paying them. This forced the school to take up collections to meet its payroll. Consequently, there was great turnover in schoolmasters, some staying for no more than a year. Also contributing to the problem was the establishment of the Collegiate School in New Haven in 1701, which drew many local academics away from Hopkins, and which later became Yale University.

Public opinion of Hopkins and academia in general weakened the school. During this time parents wanted children who could read and write English and understand basic arithmetic, but Hopkins continued to focus on subjects that parents deemed irrelevant, such as Latin. Parents were also displeased with schoolmasters who paid little attention to struggling students, instead focusing only on the scholars. On January 12, 1713, the committee which managed the Hopkins Fund began releasing £12–£15 annually to run elementary English schools in East Haven and West Haven. New Haven stopped donating money to the Fund in 1719, which made hiring schoolmasters nearly impossible. Though the trustees of the Hopkins Fund constituted an independent body, the town was known to control them with financial pressures. Richard Mansfield served as schoolmaster from 1742 to 1747, and was the last headmaster until 1839 to serve for more than three years.

Although Hopkins School was still somewhat unpopular with the locals, the school moved to a new larger brick building on the Green, due to the growth of New Haven. Hopkins School was somewhat rare among American schools in that it remained open during the American Revolutionary War. Former schoolmaster John Hotchkiss was killed by the British in July 1779 during their invasion of New Haven, and former schoolmaster Noah Williston was captured. Although the school remained open, records seem to indicate that it was frequently closed between September 1780 and October 1781, "for vacation". Shortly after the Revolution, Hopkins hired Jared Mansfield for two terms (1786–1790 and 1790–1795) to the unique position "Master of the Grammar School" to try to stabilize the school for the future. Between Mansfield's two terms, Abraham Bishop held a six-month term as headmaster during which he proposed radical reform, including making Hopkins coeducational, most of which never came to fruition. After the end of Mansfield's second term, the school returned to the pattern of short tenures for schoolmasters.

Hopkins moved buildings again in 1803 to an even larger facility near the Green that took up nearly an entire block. Teachers were offered two-year contracts to teach at Hopkins, but rarely kept them. Hopkins boys grew "unruly and malicious", some roaming New Haven streets at night. In 1838 the school moved once again, as the trustees believed that moving the school away from the town center would allow its students to focus more on their studies. Throughout August and September that year, they rushed through the necessary transactions to buy the new plot of land, currently the site of the Yale Law School. Following this move the trustees released an announcement to New Haven's three newspapers summarizing their hope that this new location would provide sufficient space for the boys to learn and be separate enough that they could do so in peace.

A plan from 1922 for Hopkins atop the hill by 1895 graduate Henry Murphy. Baldwin ended up being built roughly between "The School" and "Masters House" on this plan.

Hawley Olmstead became headmaster in 1839 and ended the line of short-termed schoolmasters as he held the position for ten years. Although Olmstead thought much like Hopkins' early masters, namely that the school existed to prepare boys for college, he also modernized the curriculum in several ways. Most notably, English was finally added to the curriculum, and he began keeping accurate school rolls which solidified his final legacy, increasing the size of Hopkins' student body. By the time Olmstead resigned due to poor health on July 28, 1849, school attendance had risen to 63 students.

As soon as Olmstead left, the school began to deteriorate once again, with attendance dropping to 45 students in 1850 and to 20 by 1853. The recently founded debate society disbanded, with seven young members forming the secret society known as "The Club". Though this club grew no larger and tried to remain quiet, parents grew so annoyed with this supposedly "rough-housing" club that it was forced to disband in 1851. After the debate society and "The Club" were gone, many students sought out new ways to express their literary interests, including founding the school newspaper, The Critic. Olmstead was seen by the trustees as a major failure and a cause of the school's rapid decline, and was quickly replaced by James Morris Whiton, who had just recently graduated from Yale. He further revised the curriculum by adding more English classes, and school attendance saw a rapid increase once again. Whiton taught for ten years and under his leadership, enrollment climbed to more than 100 students, thus marking the end of "the fallow years."

=== Modern day ===
Headmaster George Lovell convinced the Board of Trustees to buy land on the western edge of New Haven for a new campus atop a hill in 1925. Graduate Henry Murphy laid out plans for the new campus in 1922, and designed the original Baldwin Hall building in 1925. The school opened at the new premises, the present campus, in 1926. Baldwin Hall was initially the only building, but the campus expanded greatly over the next century.

Hopkins had begun to refer to itself without "Grammar School" in the casual name by 1935, but "Grammar School" was not officially dropped until several years after Hopkins' merger with Day Prospect Hill School in 1972. Day Prospect Hill School was itself the product of a merger between two local women's schools — the Day School (founded in 1907) and the Prospect Hill School (founded in 1930). The combined institution became the Day Prospect Hill School (DPH), a united women's education school.

Trustee president Vince Calarco and headmaster Tim Rodd led Hopkins to buy a further 50 acres (20 ha) of land at its current location to establish playing fields in 1992.

In recent years alumnus John C. Malone, a wealthy telecommunications entrepreneur, has donated more than $25 million for new construction, the financial aid program, and forming the endowment.

On March 24, 2020, it was announced that Hopkins School and the Roman Catholic Archdiocese of Hartford agreed to settle a sexual abuse lawsuit involving a Catholic school teacher who was regularly allowed access to the Hopkins School and who was accused of sexually abusing boys while coaching at the school between at least 1990 and 1991. Both Hopkins and the Archdiocese of Hartford were accused of covering up the sex abuse and shielding the teacher from potential prosecution. The terms of the settlement were not disclosed. The accused teacher, Glenn Goncalo, committed suicide in 1991 as arrangements were being made for him to turn himself over to the police in connection to a different accusation. It was also reported that reports of sexual abuse at Hopkins dated as far back as 1970.

== Facilities ==
A map of the campus in 2006, with Forest Road horizontally along the bottom of the map

Baldwin Hall is the original building of the present campus. It has four floors, including the basement. It houses a computer lab, the language lab, and the Calarco Library. The library is a two floor, 14,000-square-foot (1,300 m^{2}) space with group study rooms, an art gallery, and a faculty reading room.

The Kneisel Squash Center was originally built as an all-purpose gym in 1935 and named the Reigeluth Gym in honor of a trustee. It was designed by the architect Douglas Orr. In 2010, it was converted into a squash center, housing six squash courts.

Lovell Hall held the Townshend Auditorium, classrooms, and offices. The building was named after longtime headmaster George Lovell, who led the school in the first half of the 20th century. It was constructed in 1960 with funds raised during the school's tercentenary. It underwent renovation, and was replaced with the new Academic and Performing Arts Center in 2024.

The Academic and Performing Arts Center (APAC) has a theater, practice performance spaces, costume studios, language and social science classrooms, and common spaces. It was constructed in 2025.

The Malone Science Center is at the center of campus and houses the science classrooms and labs. Donated by John C. Malone, it was opened for students in 1999 and has three floors of classrooms and labs. In 2025, a new robotics lab was constructed with areas for 3D printing, machining, and more.

Heath Commons is a two-story building that houses the school dining hall and a student lounge. Heath Commons was designed by the S/L/A/M collaborative. It was completed in 2003 and won a Connecticut Design Award in 2005.

Thompson Hall was opened on 30 November 2009 on the former site of one of the upper playing fields. It is named for Mary Brewster Thompson, a long-time head of the Prospect Hill School. The three-story building has two floors of classrooms, as well as art studios, pottery, photography, wood shop, and choral and orchestral spaces.

The Walter Camp Athletic Center is a two story gymnasium. On the first floor resides 4 indoor basketball and volleyball courts, the trainers (health center), lockers and changing rooms, and a 25 yard pool (under renovation in 2026). From two stairwells, the upper floor can be accessed, containing a gym facility, and poolside bleachers.

== Academics ==
The 1911 school body. Headmaster Charles H. Weller is first on the left in the third row and George Lovell is 7th from the left in the top row (he would go on to be headmaster from 1916–1953).

Applicants to Hopkins undergo a series of standardized tests, and upon matriculation, testing is done to place students at the appropriate level of instruction in mathematics and languages. Hopkins' academics are broken into departments including English, mathematics, science, history, arts, modern language, classics, and computer science. Each of the three class levels — Lower, Middle, and Upper — has a different level of choice in classes.

=== Humanities ===
The English Department is the only department in which Hopkins requires a student have at least one class in every semester. Upper-class students have two required semester classes: a college-prep writing course and a Shakespeare-centered course. The History Department core is the Atlantic Communities series that focuses on Europe, the Americas, and West Africa between 1450 and modern times. In addition, elective courses go into detail on subjects such as political science, regional studies, philosophy and religion. Advanced Placement courses are offered in United States History, European History, and Human Geography. The Language Department is divided into two subdepartments: the Classics, which covers Ancient Greek and Latin; and Modern Languages, which teaches four other languages (French, Spanish, Chinese, and Italian are currently offered).

=== Math and Science ===
The Mathematics Department offers study from pre-algebra to Linear Algebra and Multivariable Calculus. The Science Department has three main tracks — Biology, Chemistry, and Physics — along which students can take entry-level courses and then more advanced AP and Honors courses. There are numerous one-off courses in subjects such as Introduction to Psychology, Human Reproduction, or Environmental Studies. The computer science department offers basic computing courses in HTML and Java.

== Athletics ==
The 1891 football team

Hopkins' athletics function under a trimester system, with students taking an athletic for each of the fall, winter, and spring seasons. Students may choose to participate in a team sport if they make the team, an intramural sport, or an independent sport where the student participates in a school-approved athletic activity such as martial arts lessons. Seniors may also take one season off and not take any athletic for that season. Sports offered at Hopkins vary depending on the season and include cross country, soccer, water polo, downhill skiing, crew, football, field hockey, volleyball, basketball, fencing, track (both outdoor and indoor), swimming/diving, wrestling, squash, golf, lacrosse, tennis, baseball, and softball. Hopkins is a member of the New England Preparatory School Athletic Council and the Fairchester Athletic Association. Hopkins competes with many other private and boarding schools throughout New England and the northeast.
