= Donor managed investment account =

A donor managed investment account (or DMI account) is a charitable giving mechanism in which donors receive a full tax deduction at the time they fund the DMI account, but retain investment management rights over the account, and can request donations from the account to charities.

By offering investment autonomy, the DMI account method is designed to appeal to donors who want to actively participate in the philanthropic support of a favorite charity. Donors using a DMI account to manage their gifts to qualified charities receive an upfront federal income tax and gift tax deduction for up to 50 percent of their adjusted gross income, and can actively invest the assets (independently or through a financial manager) in various investment vehicles, including hedge funds, private equity and real estate.

The technique was developed in 2003 by Winklevoss LLC, a financial consulting firm based in Greenwich, Connecticut. In July 2004, the firm received a favorable private letter ruling from the U.S. Internal Revenue Service that effectively confirmed the tax-deductibility (for federal income and gift-tax purposes) of donor’s gifts that are managed in a DMI account.

Since the charity that offers the DMI account owns the donated funds outright from the time of their receipt, funds are managed in a tax-free environment, and can potentially result in a larger gift to the organization than the initial contribution. Charities can offer this method to encourage incremental gifts from investment-oriented donors, while fostering relationships between giver and recipient.

== See also ==
- Donor-advised funds
- Planned giving
- Foundation (charity)
