= Senator Haley =

Senator Haley may refer to:

- Bill Haley (Texas politician) (1943–2022), Texas State Senate
- David Haley (born 1958), Kansas State Senate
- Elisha Haley (1776–1860), Connecticut State Senate
- George W. Haley (1925–2015), Kansas State Senate
- Ted Haley (1920–2017), Washington State Senate

== See also ==
- Senator Haile (disambiguation)
- Senator Hailey (disambiguation)
- Senator Hale (disambiguation)
- Senator Hawley (disambiguation)
