= Alan Hawley =

Alan Hawley may refer to:

- Alan Hawley (footballer) (1946–2025), English footballer
- Alan Hawley (British Army officer), British doctor and academic
- Alan R. Hawley (1864–1938), early aviator in the United States

== See also ==
- Alana Hawley Purvis, Canadian actress
- Allen Hawley (1893–1978), American fundraising administrator
