= Senator Haile =

Senator Haile may refer to:

- Ferrell Haile (fl. 2000s–2010s), Tennessee State Senate
- William H. Haile (1833–1901), Massachusetts State Senate
- William Haile (New Hampshire politician) (1807–1876), New Hampshire State Senate

== See also ==
- Senator Hale (disambiguation)
- Senator Hailey (disambiguation)
- Senator Haley (disambiguation)
