= General Hawley =

General Hawley may refer to:

- Alan Hawley (British Army officer) (fl. 1970s–2000s), British Army major general
- Henry Hawley (1685–1759), British Army lieutenant general
- Joseph Roswell Hawley (1826–1905), Union Army brigadier general and brevet major general
- Paul Ramsey Hawley (1891–1965), U.S. Army major general
- Richard E. Hawley (born 1942), U.S. Air Force general
