= Thomas Hawley (priest) =

Irish clergyman in the 18th century

Thomas Hawley was a clergyman in the Church of Ireland during the 18th century.

Hawley was educated at Trinity College, Dublin. He was Archdeacon of Dublin from 1710 until 1715.
