= John Hawley =

John Hawley may refer to:

- John Hawley (died 1408), MP for Dartmouth, mayor and alleged pirate, called the elder, father of the below
- John Hawley (died 1436), MP for Dartmouth (UK Parliament constituency), called the younger, son of the above
- John Hawley (priest), Archdeacon of Blackburn
- John Hawley (footballer), English footballer
- John B. Hawley, U.S. Representative from Illinois
- John F. Hawley, American astrophysicist and professor of astronomy
- Jack Hawley, American politician from Idaho
- John Hawley Glover, Royal Navy officer
- John Hawley Edwards, English footballer
