= Francis Hawley =

Francis Hawley may refer to:

- Francis Hawley (Corfe Castle MP), English politician
- Francis Hawley, 1st Baron Hawley, English politician, soldier and peer
- Francis Hawley, 2nd Baron Hawley, British landowner and politician
