= Hawley Olmstead =

American politician (1793–1868)

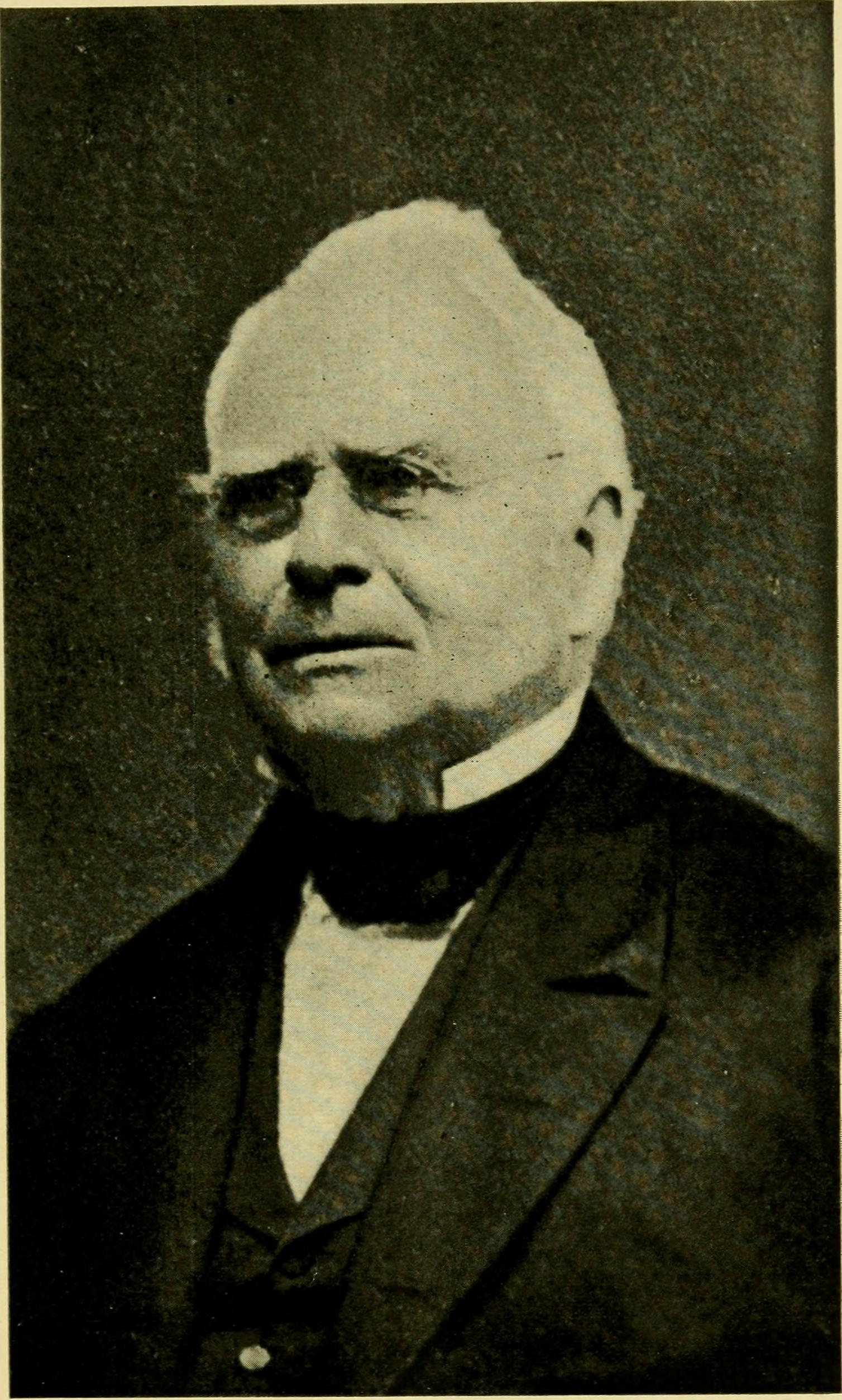
Hawley Olmstead

Hawley Olmstead (December 17, 1793 – December 3, 1868) was an American politician and educator. He served in the Connecticut State Legislature. He was the rector of Hopkins Grammar School in New Haven, Connecticut.

== Early life ==
Olmstead was born at Wilton, Connecticut. He formed the early purpose of acquiring a liberal education, and, as means for study were not at his command, he left his father's farm at the age of 14 and taught school three years. The latter part of his preparatory course was passed at the Academy at Greenfield Hill, Connecticut, as an assistant pupil. He entered Yale College as a sophomore in 1813. Ill health and weak eyes caused him great trouble during his course and subsequently, so that he was obliged to abandon professional studies.

== Career ==
He therefore turned his attention to the instruction of youth, and opened in his native town an academy for both sexes. Here he taught four and a half years, and at Norwalk, Connecticut, three years. His health failing he returned to Wilton, and for two years and a half engaged in agricultural pursuits, instructing at the same time a few private pupils He then reopened the academy, and taught thirteen years, when he removed to New Haven, to take charge of the Hopkins Grammar School. After a service here of more than ten years, which he regarded as the chief work of his life, he was compelled by ill health to resign the office of rector. He continued to give private instruction until 1860. In 1862, Yale College conferred on him the degree of LL.D.

He represented his native town in the Connecticut State Legislature in 1825, '26, '28 and '29 and the Second Senatorial District in 1853. His report, as Chairman of a Select Committee on Common Schools in 1826, forms the basis of the present common school law. During the last year of his life, Dr. Olmstead was very feeble and apprehensive of sudden death. On Thursday morning, Dec. 3, 1868, the "Circle of Retired Ministers and Laymen" of which he was a valued member, held their weekly meeting at his house by his request; and he died suddenly while addressing the meeting on the topic of discussion.

== Personal life ==
Olmstead married Harriet Smith on April 30, 1818. She was the daughter of Phineas Smith of New Canaan, Connecticut. They had nine children, five who survived him.

Olmstead died on December 3, 1868 in New Haven, Connecticut at the age of 75 years.
