= James Hawley =

James Hawley may refer to:

- James H. Hawley (1847–1929), American attorney and politician from Idaho
- James Edwin Hawley (1897–1965), Canadian geologist and professor
- James Hawley (Lord Lieutenant) (born 1937), British businessman and public servant
