= Jesse Hawley =

Jesse Hawley may refer to:

- Jesse Hawley (merchant) (fl. early 19th century), American entrepreneur and activist
- Jesse Hawley (American football) (1887–1946), American football coach
