= William Hawley (disambiguation) =

William Hawley (1851–1941) was a British archaeologist.

William Hawley may also refer to:

- William Dickinson Hawley (1784–1845), American Episcopal clergyman
- William Hawley (general) (1824–1873), Union Army colonel in the American Civil War
- Willie Hawley (1918–1923), English footballer

== See also ==
- William Hawley Clark
- William Halley
- William Howley
