= Steve Hawley =

Steve Hawley may refer to:

- Steven Hawley (born 1951), NASA astronaut
- Steve Hawley (artist) (born 1952), British artist
- Stephen Hawley (born c. 1947), member of the New York State Assembly
