= Hawley, Idaho =

Unincorporated community in the state of Idaho, United States

Coordinates: 42°44′03″N 113°23′45″W

Hawley was an unincorporated community in Blaine County, in the U.S. state of Idaho. A variant name was "Hawley Siding".

== History ==
The community was named after James H. Hawley, 9th Governor of Idaho.
