= Donor-advised fund =

Charitable giving vehicle

In the United States, a donor-advised fund (DAF) is a charitable giving vehicle administered by a public charity created to manage charitable donations on behalf of organizations, families, or individuals. To participate in a donor-advised fund, a donating individual or organization opens an account in the fund and deposits cash, securities, or other financial instruments. They surrender ownership of anything they put in the fund but retain advisory privileges over how their account is invested, and how it distributes money to charities. Use of a donor-advised fund is a legal form of tax avoidance.

== Details ==
A donor-advised fund is an account at a sponsoring organization, generally a public charity, where an individual can make a charitable gift to enjoy an immediate tax benefit and retain advisory privileges to disburse charitable gifts over time. The contribution a donor makes to their donor-advised fund is 100% irrevocable and destined for a final 501(c)(3) organization. Donor-advised funds provide a flexible way for donors to pass money through to charities—an alternative to direct giving or creating a private foundation. Donors enjoy administrative convenience (the sponsoring organization does the paperwork after the initial donation), cost savings (a foundation requires around 2.5% to 4% of its assets each year to run), and tax advantages (versus individual giving) by conducting their grantmaking through the fund.

A donor-advised fund has some disadvantages compared to a private foundation, and some advantages. Both can accept donations of unusual or illiquid assets (e.g., part ownership of a private company, art, real estate, partnerships or limited partnership shares), but a donor-advised fund has higher deductions for these gifts (depending on the gift). In addition, the founders or board of a private foundation have complete control over where its giving goes within broad legal bounds. In a donor-advised fund, the donor only advises the sponsoring organization where the money should go. While rare, a sponsoring organization could conceivably ignore the donor's intent. In addition, most donor-advised funds can give solely to IRS 501(c)(3) organizations or their foreign equivalents. This rules out, for example, most kinds of donations to individuals and scholarships –both things a private foundation can do more easily. As well, it precludes donations to political campaigns, lobbying organizations, etc.

Donor-advised funds do reap a significant cost advantage (foundations carry a 2.5–4% of assets overhead expense to maintain, a 1–2% excise tax on NET investment earnings and a required 5% spending of assets each year) but may also have one more drawback: a limited lifetime, although this varies depending on the sponsor. American Endowment Foundation for example allows successor advisors in perpetuity. While a foundation can persist for generations or in perpetuity, some sponsoring organizations impose a "sunset" on donor-advised funds, after which they collapse individual funds into their general charity pool.

Because a public charity houses the fund, donors receive the maximum tax deduction available, while avoiding excise taxes and other restrictions imposed on private foundations. Further, donors avoid the cost of establishing and administering a private foundation, including staffing and legal fees. The donor receives the maximum tax deduction at the time they donate to their account, and the organization that administers the fund gains full control over the contribution, granting the donor advisory status. As such, the administrating fund is not legally bound to the donor but makes grants to other public charities on the donor's recommendation.

Drexel University environmental sociologist Robert Brulle, who has studied networks of nonprofit funding, described donor-advised funds:

In this type of foundation, individuals or other foundations contribute money to the donor directed foundation, and it then makes grants based on the stated preferences of the original contributor. This process ensures that the intent of the contributor is met while also hiding that contributor's identity. Because contributions to a donor directed foundation are not required to be made public, their existence provides a way for individuals or corporations to make anonymous contributions.

Whitney Ball, co-founder and executive director of the donor-advised fund Donors Trust, described donor-advised funds:

A donor-advised fund begins with a donor contributing cash or assets to a public charity, which in turn creates a separate account for the donor, who may recommend disbursements from the fund to other public charities. Technically, the charity that sponsors the fund has the final say on the disbursements, and it is legally required to ensure they go only to charitable purposes, but in normal circumstances the original donor's requests will be followed.

Since 2010, some donor-advised funds have become less like traditional foundations. The simultaneous growth of DAFs and online giving led to funds such as the now-defunct CharityBox, that were run by start-up companies through a web/mobile platform.

== History ==
The New York Community Trust pioneered donor-advised funds in 1931, and the second such fund was created in 1935. Since then, commercial sponsors, educational institutions, and independent charities have started offering the service. As of 2015, donor-advised funds were the fastest growing charitable giving vehicle in the U.S. –more than 269,000 donor-advised accounts held over $78 billion in assets.

== See also ==
- Charitable organization
- Donor managed investment account
- Foundation (charity)
- Endowment tax
