= Gideon Hawley =

American missionary

Gideon Hawley (1727–1807) was a missionary to the Haudenosaunee and other indigenous people in Massachusetts and on the Susquehanna River in New York.

== Biography ==
He was born in the Stratfield section of Stratford, now Bridgeport, Connecticut, in New England on November 5, 1727. The son of Gideon Hawley and Hannah Bennett who was the daughter of Lieutenant James Bennett. Hawley's mother died at his birth and his father died three years later. He was the grandson of Ephraim and Sarah (Welles) Hawley from Trumbull. He was the great-grandson of Joseph Hawley (Captain), first of the Hawley name to come to America in 1629, and was twice great-grandson of Thomas Welles, governor of the Colony of Connecticut. He married Lucy Fessenden, second daughter of Reverend Benjamin Fessenden (Harvard 1718) and Rebecca (Smith) Fessenden, of Sandwich. They had three sons and two daughters. Lucy died December 25, 1777, at 50. Gideon married again to Mrs. Elizabeth Burchard, widow of Captain David Burchard of Nantucket, on October 7, 1778.

== Religious education ==
Hawley graduated from Yale in 1749. He was licensed to preach in May 1750. In 1752, in Stockbridge, Massachusetts, he accepted a position with the Society for Propagating the Gospel among the Indians, under the supervision of Jonathan Edwards who was a preacher to the whites and the Housatonic Indians in Stockbridge. Hawley taught Mohawk, Oneida, and Tuscarora Indians there, with Edwards occasionally visiting to give advice.

== Missionary to the Indians ==
In 1753, Hawley accepted a position from the commissioners of Indian affairs to establish a mission among the Six Nations at the town of Oquaga on the Susquehanna, near what is now Windsor, New York, in the area where another Yale graduate, Rev. Elihu Spencer, had made an unsuccessful attempt at ministry in the late 1740s. Hawley left for the site in 1754. Besides acting as a missionary, Hawley also acted as an interpreter at this post.

== French and Indian War ==
The French and Indian War did not affect his mission until 1756, when he was forced to leave. He then went to Boston and joined the army as chaplain of Colonel Richard Gridley's regiment, and attempted after this campaign to return to the Haudenosaunee mission, but the enterprise proved too hazardous. He spent the winter in West Springfield, Massachusetts, and tried to rejoin his mission in the spring of 1757, but an outbreak of small pox there prevented him from returning. The commissioners of the Society for propagating the gospel appointed him pastor of the Indian tribes at Mashpee, Massachusetts, where he was installed in April 1758 and remained as a missionary until his death in 1807.

== Reverend Timothy Dwight IV ==
Timothy Dwight IV in his Travels in New England and New York, writes about his visit with Hawley on October 2, 1800, and his correspondence with him afterward. Dwight wrote that after dinner he went to Hawley's house to visit and had an interview, "more interesting than words can describe" with Hawley. Dwight had not seen Hawley since he was a young man of eighteen. Dwight writes; "this gentleman was a most intimate friend of my parents. From his youth he had sustained as amiable and unexceptionable a character as can perhaps be found among uninspired men". During this visit in 1800, Gideon's son James was on his deathbed. Hawley wrote to Dwight on April 29, 1801, to tell him of the death of his son James, eight days after his visit. He wrote to Dwight again on September 21, 1802, and both letters are published in Dwight's work, published posthumously in London in 1823.

- His gravestone reads:

Gideon Hawley 1807
In memory of
Rev Gideon Hawley who was
born at Stratford, Connecticut, Nov 5 O S 1727
graduated at Yale College 1749
ordained in Boston July 31, 1754
a missionary to the Indians at
Onohaguage or the Six Nations
installed at Mashpee April 10, 1758
died Oct'r 3 1807 AEt 80
There the wicked cease from troubling
and the weary are at rest

== See also ==
- Gideon Hawley House
