= Hawley, Missouri =

Human settlement in Wright County, Missouri, US

Coordinates: 37°10′08″N 92°20′55″W

Hawley is a ghost town in Wright County, in the U.S. state of Missouri.

The community was located south of Missouri Route N approximately 5.5 miles northwest of Mountain Grove. Whetstone Creek flows past the west side of the location.

A post office called Hawley was established in 1883, and remained in operation until 1906. The community has the name of the local Hawley family.
