= Joseph Hawley =

Joseph Hawley may refer to:

- Joseph Hawley (captain) (1603–1690), American settler
- Joseph Hawley (Massachusetts politician) (1723–1788), colonial and Revolutionary lawyer and legislator
- Sir Joseph Henry Hawley, 3rd Baronet (1813–1875), English racehorse owner and breeder
- Joseph Roswell Hawley (1826–1905), Governor of Connecticut, U.S. senator and Congressman
- Joe Hawley (born 1988), American football player
- Joe Hawley, American musician of the band Tally Hall
