= Willis Nichols Hawley =

American soldier (1875–1898)

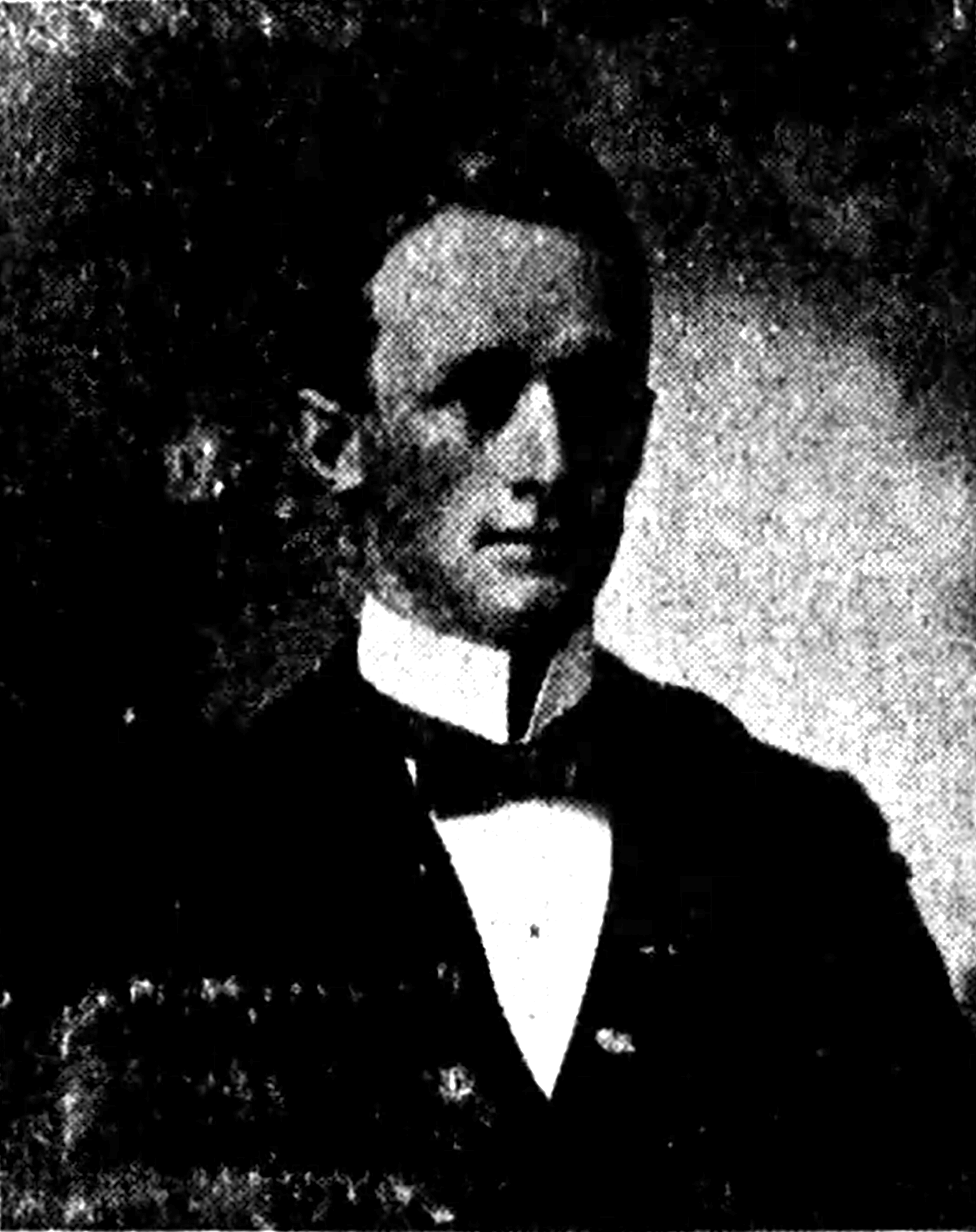
- Hawley circa 1898
- Born: August 9, 1875; Newtown, Connecticut, US
- Died: November 19, 1898 (aged 23) Philadelphia, Pennsylvania, US
- Allegiance: United States
- Branch: United States Army
- Rank: First Sergeant
- Conflicts: Spanish–American War
- Alma mater: University of Connecticut

Willis Nichols Hawley (August 9, 1875 – November 19, 1898) was an American soldier who died of typhoid fever during the Spanish–American War. Hawley was the first student or alumnus of the University of Connecticut (Storrs Agricultural College at the time) to die while on active duty during wartime. The Willis Nichols Hawley Armory on the university's campus in Storrs was named in his honour.

== Biography ==
Hawley was born in the village of Hawleyville, located in Newtown, Connecticut, on August 9, 1875. He came from an old Connecticut family. His parents were Homer Augustus Hawley, farmer, and Grace (Nichols) Hawley, homemaker. Willis was the eldest of three children, including Sarah Louisa Hawley (born 1879) and James Shepard Hawley (born 1881). He spent three years at Newtown Academy starting in 1891.

Hawley enrolled at Storrs Agricultural College in the fall of 1895. He pursued the three-year agricultural program and was a member of the Class of 1898. "Quiet and unassuming," he received good grades, played right end on the Connecticut Aggies football maet, and participated in the Shakespearean Club on campus. A crack shot, he claimed to have bagged 39 groundhogs in one afternoon. Hawley served as the student leader and first lieutenant of the college's cadet company, overseen by Professor Henry A. Ballou. He graduated in spring 1898.

In June 1898, soon after the Spanish–American War erupted, Hawley volunteered for the US Army along with four classmates. He served as first sergeant (or orderly sergeant) of Company H, Third Regiment, Connecticut Volunteer Infantry. The unit was raised in Stonington and was stationed at Camp George Meade in Pennsylvania. In September, Hawley spent a six-day furlough visiting friends in Storrs.

During the war, disease ran rampant in the overcrowded and unsanitary military encampments in the United States. "Typhoid fever and not Spanish bayonets was the principal hazard of war," observed college historian Walter Stemmons. Typhoid fever infected 20,000 recruits in 1898, killing more than 1,500 of them—far more than the number of troops killed in action. Hawley was among typhoid's victims.

Hawley was taken sick at Camp Meade on November 1. He was hospitalized first at the division hospital and then at the American Red Cross hospital in Philadelphia, but the fever worsened and he died at 1:30 p.m. on November 19, 1898, at the age of 23. His mother was by his side when he died. The cause of death was typhoid fever. Hawley never saw combat.

== Legacy ==
Hawley was the first student or alumnus of the University of Connecticut to die while on active duty during wartime. He was one of only five Storrs Agricultural College students to volunteer to fight in the Spanish–American War. He was also one of only two of Newtown's native sons to serve in the war (the other, US Navy sailor Charles G. Morris, survived the war).

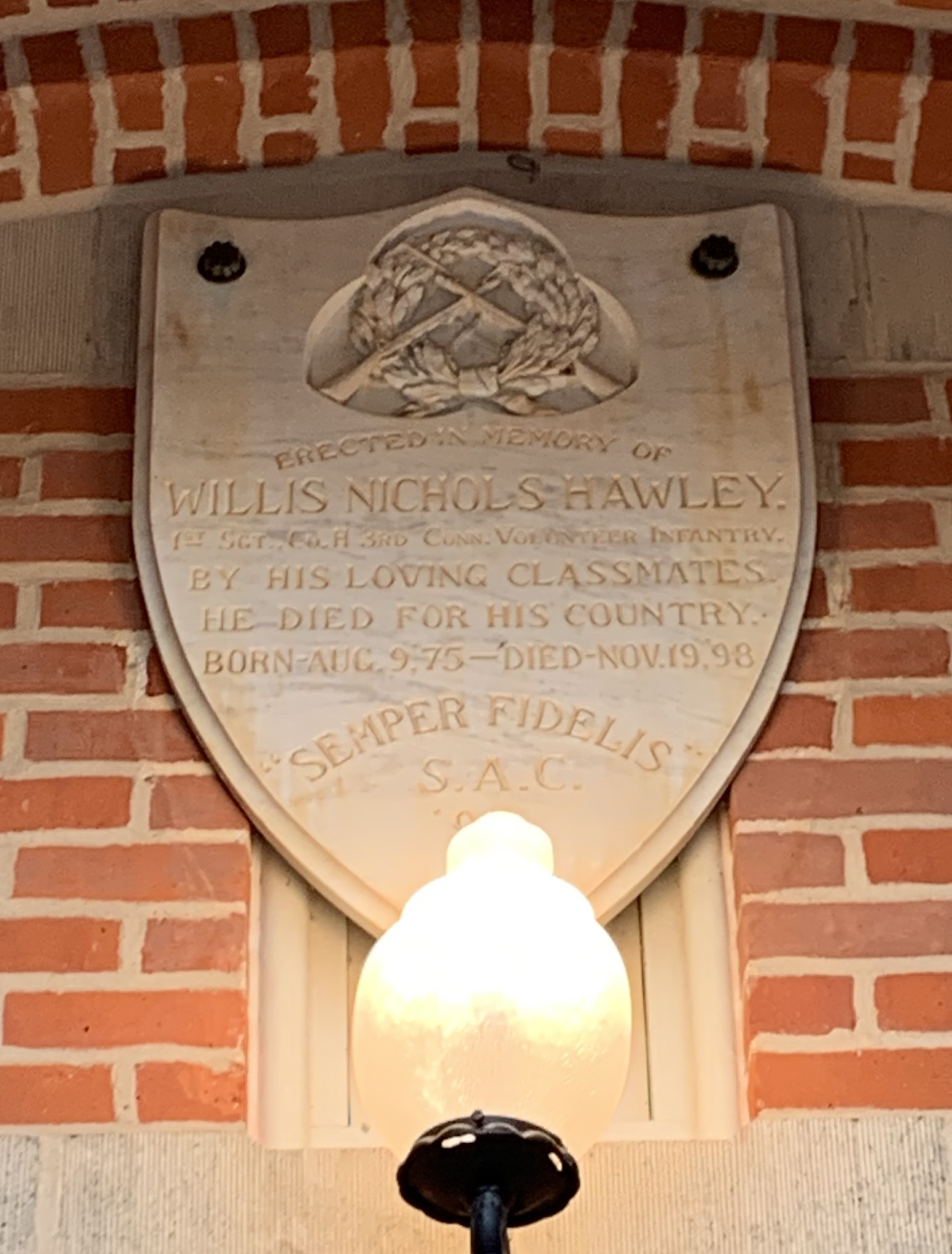
Plaque at Hawley Armory

In 1913, the Connecticut General Assembly appropriated $60,000 for an auditorium and armory in Storrs. Opened in 1914, with a seating capacity of 1,400, the building was named the Willis Nichols Hawley Armory in Hawley's memory. The Hawley Armory hosted military training and served as the site of basketball games, swim meets, school dances, theatrical productions, graduation ceremonies, lectures, and even town meetings for decades. Renovated in the 1990s, the building now holds a fitness center and hosts health and wellness programs for UConn staff and students. It also houses the Department of Allied Health Sciences and the Veterans Affairs and Military Programs. In 2020, Hawley Armory was the site of UConn staff COVID-19 testing.

In 1899, Hawley's classmates installed a commemorative plaque in an alcove in the college chapel. Crafted of Italian marble in the shape of a shield, the tablet features the inscription below. After Hawley Armory opened, the tablet was moved to a location above the Armory's front entrance.

Erected in Memory of
Willis Nichols Hawley.
1st Sgt. Co. H. 3rd Conn. Volunteer Infantry.
By His Loving Classmates.
He Died for His Country.
Born Aug. 9, '75 – Died Nov. 19, '98.
"Semper Fidelis."
S.A.C. '98
