= Gideon Hawley House =

Historic house in Massachusetts, United States

- U.S. National Register of Historic Places
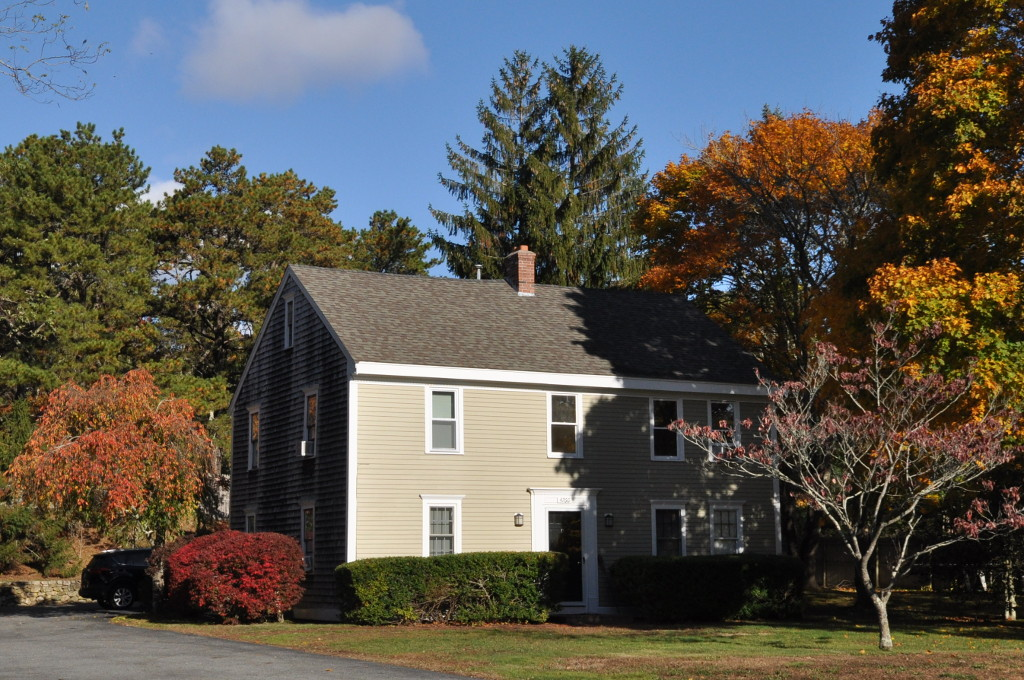

- Location within Cape Cod Location within Massachusetts Location within the United States
- Location: 4766 Falmouth Rd., Barnstable, Massachusetts
- Coordinates: 41°38′11″N 70°27′16″W
- Built: 1758
- Architectural style: Georgian
- MPS: Barnstable MRA
- NRHP reference No.: 87000312
- Added to NRHP: March 13, 1987

The Gideon Hawley House is a historic house along Massachusetts Route 28 near the Cotuit village of Barnstable, Massachusetts.

== Description and history ==
The Georgian style house was built c. 1758 by missionary Gideon Hawley, who ministered to the nearby Mashpee Wampanoags, and he lived there until his death in 1807. It is a 2 1/2-story wood-frame structure, four bays wide, with a side-gable roof, wood shingled exterior, and a slightly off-center chimney that is not original. The entrance, located in the second bay from the left, is flanked by pilasters and sheltered by an early-20th-century portico. A rear kitchen ell is probably a 19th-century addition. The house was moved back from its original site during a road widening project in 1920.

The house was listed on the National Register of Historic Places on March 13, 1987.

== See also ==
- National Register of Historic Places listings in Barnstable County, Massachusetts
