= Frank Hawley (cricketer) =

English cricketer

Personal information
- Full name: Frank Hawley
- Born: 19 July 1877; New Radford, Nottinghamshire, England
- Died: 23 August 1913 (aged 36); Sutton-in-Ashfield, Nottinghamshire, England
- Batting: Unknown
- Bowling: Unknown arm fast-medium

Domestic team information
- Years: Team
- 1897: Nottinghamshire

Career statistics
Competition	First-class
Matches	1
Runs scored	1
Batting average	1.00
100s/50s	–/–
Top score	1
Balls bowled	120
Wickets	1
Bowling average	67.00
5 wickets in innings	–
10 wickets in match	–
Best bowling	1/31
Catches/stumpings	–/–
- Source: Cricinfo, 26 November 2011

Frank Hawley (19 July 1877 – 23 August 1913) was an English cricketer. Hawley's batting style is unknown, though it is known he bowled fast-medium. It is not known with which arm he bowled. He was born at New Radford, Nottinghamshire.

Hawley made a single first-class appearance for Nottinghamshire against Yorkshire at Trent Bridge in the 1897 County Championship. He bowled 14 wicketless overs in Yorkshire's first-innings, while in Nottinghamshire's first-innings he was dismissed for a single run by Bobby Peel. In Yorkshire's second-innings he took the wicket of George Hirst, finishing with figures of 1/31 from 10 overs. The match ended in a draw.

He died at Sutton-in-Ashfield, Nottinghamshire on 23 August 1913.
