= Dwight Hawley =

American politician

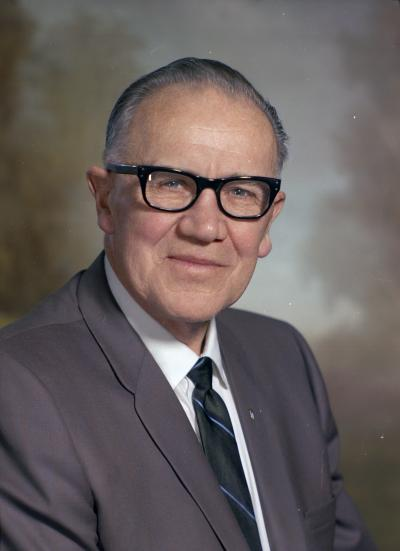
- Hawley in 1967

Member of the Washington House of Representatives for the 44th district
- In office 1950–1971

Personal details
- Born: July 2, 1896 Ballard, Washington, United States
- Died: September 14, 1981 (aged 85) Washington, United States
- Party: Republican

Dwight Spencer Hawley (July 2, 1896 – September 14, 1981) was an American politician in the state of Washington. He served in the Washington House of Representatives from 1950 to 1971.
