= Orville Smidt =

American politician (1943–2025)

Member of the South Dakota Senate from the 7th district
- In office 2005–2009

Member of the South Dakota House of Representatives from the 7th district
- In office 1997–2005

Personal details
- Born: June 7, 1943 Brookings, South Dakota, U.S.
- Died: December 23, 2025 (aged 82) Brookings, South Dakota, U.S.
- Party: Republican
- Spouse: Charlotte
- Children: 2
- Profession: Businessman, military officer

Orville B. Smidt (June 7, 1943 – December 23, 2025) was an American politician. He served in the South Dakota House of Representatives from 1999 to 2005 and in the Senate from 2005 to 2009. Smidt died at his home in Brookings, South Dakota, on December 23, 2025, at the age of 82.
