= Tim Reed =

American politician

Member of the South Dakota House of Representatives from the 7th district
- Incumbent
- Assumed office January 10, 2017 Serving with Spencer Hawley (2017–2019); Doug Post (2019–2021); Larry Tidemann (2021–present)

Mayor, Brookings, South Dakota
- In office 2009–2016

Personal details
- Born: July 13, 1965 (age 61) Brookings, South Dakota, U.S.
- Party: Republican
- Spouse: Mary
- Children: 2
- Education: South Dakota State University

Tim Reed (born July 13, 1965) is an American politician in the South Dakota Senate. He was a Republican representing the 7th district in the South Dakota House of Representatives.

== Early life ==
Reed was born in Brookings, South Dakota. He holds a Bachelor of Science degree in Computer Science and Economics from South Dakota State University.

== Political career ==
Reed served as mayor of Brookings, South Dakota from 2009 to 2016.

In 2016, Reed ran for election to represent District 7 in the South Dakota House of Representatives. He was unopposed in the Republican primary, and won one of the two seats in the general election (the other going to Democrat Spencer Hawley). In 2018, Reed and fellow Republican Doug Post defeated two Democrats and one independent candidate. Reed was re-elected in 2020.

Reed currently sits on the following committees:

- Local Government
- Taxation
- Mental Health Services Delivery Task Force

=== Electoral record ===
2016 general election: South Dakota House of Representatives, District 7
Party	Candidate	Votes	%
Republican	Tim Reed	5,457	41.5%
Democratic	Spencer Hawley	4,788	36.42%
Democratic	Linda Brandt	2,903	22.08%

2018 general election: South Dakota House of Representatives, District 7
Party	Candidate	Votes	%
Republican	Tim Reed	4,593	32.9%
Republican	Doug Post	3,132	22.5%
Democratic	Dwight Adamson	2,468	17.7%
Independent	Cory Ann Ellis	1,976	1.42%
Democratic	Zachary Kovach	1,780	12.8%

2020 Republican primary: South Dakota House of Representatives, District 7
Party	Candidate	Votes	%
Republican	Tim Reed	1,205	40.9%
Republican	Larry Tidemann	977	33.2%
Republican	Doug Post	764	25.9%
