= Charitable remainder unitrust =

Irrevocable trust with non-charitable and charitable beneficiaries

A charitable remainder unitrust (known as a "CRUT") is an irrevocable trust created under the authority of the United States Internal Revenue Code § 664 ("Code"). This special, irrevocable trust has two primary characteristics: (1) Once established, the CRUT distributes a fixed percentage of the value of its assets (on an annual or more frequent basis) to a non-charitable beneficiary (which may be the settlor of the trust); and (2) At the expiration of a specified time (which may be the death of the settlor), the remaining balance of the CRUT's assets is distributed to charity. The trustee determines the fair market value of the CRUT's assets at the time of contribution and thereafter on the applicable valuation date. The fixed annuity percentage must be at least 5% and no more than 50% of the fair market value of the assets in the corpus. The remainder (the amount expected to go to charity) must be at least 10% of the fair market value of the assets contributed to the CRUT. Code Section 664(d)(1) sets the federal income tax requirements for a charitable remainder unitrust.

For example, assume an individual, Mr. Smith, has $1 million of publicly traded stock and would like to establish a CRUT. Assume the CRUT is set up to pay the annuity to Mr. Smith over his lifetime. Mr. Smith selects a 10% CRUT. The CRUT will pay Mr. Smith 10% of its assets (initially $100,000) per year until Mr. Smith dies. At that time, any balance remaining in the CRUT will be distributed to charity. The term "unitrust" means the annuity percentage is fixed; the CRUT will distribute 10% of the value of the CRUT's assets each year, and the CRUT's value may increase or decrease over time.

== History ==
Code § 664 (authorizing CRUTs) was added to the Code in 1969, as part of the Tax Reform Act of 1969 (Pub. L. No. 91-172).

== Requirements ==
A charitable remainder unitrust is a trust that meets both: (1) The applicable rules under state law for a valid Charitable Trust; and (2) the requirements outlined in Code Section 664(d)(2).

=== State Law Requirements ===
First, a CRUT is formed like any other kind of trust and must be valid under state law. Most states require CRUTs to be registered with the state. For example, California requires charitable trusts to be registered by filing a form CT-1 with the state attorney general. This is because the state attorney general represents the charitable interests involved with CRUT. However, California Govt. Code Section 12585(a) provides that "A trustee is not required to register as long as the charitable interest in a trust is a future interest, but shall do so within 30 days after any charitable interest in a trust becomes a present interest."

=== Income Tax Requirements ===
Code Section 664 imposes the following requirements on CRUTs:

==== Fixed percentage payment ====
The CRUT must distribute a fixed percentage annuity to the non-charitable beneficiary. This percentage may not be less than 5 percent nor more than 50 percent of the net fair market value of the CRUT's assets. The CRUT's assets are valued annually, and the annuity amount is determined at that time. As may be seen, the amount of the annuity might vary from year to year, but the percentage always stays the same. For example, assume a 10% CRUT is established, and assume the value of its portfolio holdings in year 1 is $1 million. The annuity that year is $100,000. Assuming the portfolio drops in value, and in year 2 is worth $900,000. The annuity in year 2 will be reduced to $90,000 (10% of the value of the CRUT's assets).

The annuity must be distributed not less often than annually to one or more persons. The "person" may be an organization, however, it may not be a charity described in 26 U.S.C. § 170(c). The CRUT is usually set up so that an annuity is paid to the settlor of the trust. In the case of natural persons, payments may be made only to those who are living at the time of the creation of the trust. The annuity is paid to that non-charitable beneficiary for his or her lifetime, or for a fixed term of years (not to exceed 20 years).

==== No other payments ====
The CRUT may not distribute any of its assets to anyone other than the annuity recipient or the qualified charity beneficiary. The CRUT may not let any of its assets be used for the benefit of anyone other than the annuity recipient, the qualified charitable beneficiary, or a charitable organization as described in section 170(c). Code Section 664(d)(2)(B).

==== Transfer remainder interest when termination of payments ====
Once the annuity period is over (i.e., at the death of the non-charitable beneficiary, or the expiration of the term of years), the remainder of the CRUT principal is distributed to charity. The charity must be an organization described in 170(c).

==== Portion of remainder interest in contributions to trusts ====
At least 10% of the statistical fair market value of each contribution of property to the trust, must be a part of the remainder interest that will pass to charity once the annuity term expires.

Treasury Regulations have imposed several other conditions relating to CRUTs:

==== NIMCRUTS ====
Treas. Reg. §1.664-3 authorizes CRUTs to be drafted so that the annuity can be the lesser of:

1. The annuity percentage, multiplied by the fair market value of the CRUT's assets (i.e., the normal annuity amount); or

2. The amount of the CRUT's "trust income" for the year.

This is known as a "net income CRUT", or NICRUT. For example, assume a 10% CRUT holds $1 million in assets. Assume the CRUT has only $70,000 of income that year. A NICRUT would distribute $70,000, because that is lesser than the ordinary $100,000 annuity.

Furthermore, Treas. Reg. §1.664-3(a)(1)(i)(b)(2) allows the CRUT to pay a "makeup amount", which means if the trust income is lower than the selected fixed percentage, the trustee can distribute a "make up amount" from the trust's income in subsequent years. This is known as a "net income/makeup CRUT", or "NIMCRUT". For example, assume the NICRUT above distributed $70,000, and had $130,000 of trust income the following year. Assume the NICRUT included the makeup provision (making it a NIMCRUT). The NIMCRUT would distribute the $130,000 to the annuity beneficiary.

The IRS has issued a series of sample CRUT forms since 1989, the latest series in 2005, known as Revenue Procedures 2005-52, 2005-53, 2005-54, 2005-55, 2005-56, 2005-57, 2005-58, and 2005-59. It is not recommended, however, that these sample forms be used verbatim and without any additional supplemented provisions.

== Income, Gift, and Estate Tax Consequences ==
=== Charitable Deductions ===
A donor is entitled to a Charitable Deduction based on the present value of the remainder interest in a CRUT. Regs. § 1.664-4(e)(3)and (4). The method of determining the charitable deduction is complicated, and is generally stated in Treas. Regs. § 1.664-4(e)(3) and (4). Various factors are taken into consideration, including the adjusted payout rate, the value of the remainder interest, the age of the measuring life (the annuitant), the term of the CRUT, the date of trust creation, and federal interest rates.

=== Gift Tax Implications ===
The grantor/donor does not make a taxable gift if he or she is the recipient of the CRUT income for life or term of years. However, the creation of a CRUT will have a gift tax consequence if an individual other than the grantor/donor (or his or her spouse) is the designated beneficiary of the CRUT income.

=== Estate Tax ===
26 U.S.C. § 2055(a) provides for a deduction from the value of the gross estate of a bequest for public, charitable, and religious purposes. Therefore, the amount of principal contributed to a CRUT is not considered for estate tax purposes. Furthermore, the corpus is not subject to probate.

=== Unrelated Business Taxable Income ===
If a CRUT has any unrelated business taxable income (UBTI), the trust is subject to a 100% excise tax on the UBTI, but retains its tax-exempt status. UBTI is generally income earned from an active business. Prior to 2007, if a CRUT received UBTI it terminated its tax-exempt status and 100% of the trust income would be taxable.

=== WIFO ===
The annuity paid from the CRUT is taxable to the person receiving the payment. The annuity is taxed in the so-called "Worst-In, First-Out" (WIFO) method. Roughly, the annuity is taxed in the following order of the CRUTs income: ordinary income, capital gain, other income, and trust corpus. The trust's income, for the year it is required to be taken into account by the trust, is assigned to one of three categories: the ordinary income, the capital gains category, or the other income.

== Tax Planning ==
CRUTs are used for a variety of reasons. Often, CRUTs can be used to save income, gift, and/or estate tax. Because the CRUT is a tax-exempt entity a CRUT can be used to sell highly appreciated assets at greatly reduced tax consequences.

For example, assume an individual purchases publicly traded stock for $50,000.00. Assume that, over time, the stock appreciates in value to $1 million. If this individual taxpayer were to sell the stock, the taxpayer would have a $950,000.00 capital gain for income tax purposes, and would be subject to a substantial capital gains tax (this example will assume a combined federal and state capital gains tax rate of 20%, or $190,000.00 of capital gains tax). One tax planning idea would be for this individual to contribute the stock to a CRUT prior to the sale of the stock. The CRUT would then sell the stock. Assuming no other activity in the CRUT account, the $190,000.00 capital gains tax on the $950,000.00 gain would be paid over the lifetime of the taxpayer (without the CRUT, the taxpayer would have to pay the $190,000.00 all at once). The taxpayer would receive an annuity from the CRUT based on the full $1 million of sales proceeds, rather than an annuity (or income stream) based on the $810,000.00 after-tax proceeds.

One possible concern for the taxpayer in the above situation is the risk of death shortly after setting up the CRUT. In such instances, the CRUT proceeds would pay to charity before the taxpayer has received much benefit from the annuity. In addition, at the taxpayer's death, the charity receives the assets that might have otherwise passed to children or other heirs. Because of this, tax planners often suggest that their clients purchase life insurance, to be held separately from the CRUT. Using life insurance mitigates the risk of early death.

For example, assume the same taxpayer above was to set up a CRUT and were to die quickly. In such instances, the balance of the CRUT would pay to charity. If this taxpayer purchased a $1 million life insurance policy, in the event of the taxpayer's premature death, the taxpayer's family would receive the $1 million life insurance proceeds and charity would receive the balance of the CRUT.

With proper planning, the life insurance proceeds received by the family would be free from all income tax and estate tax. A CRUT is a potentially attractive alternative to the purchase of an annuity. Quarterly or annual payments to the beneficiary behave like an annuity, but they have the additional advantage of the deduction from income at the time of the creation of the CRUT. The extent of this advantage depends on the current income of the person who creates the CRUT; if income is high, the tax advantage can be substantial.

== See also ==
- Charitable Remainder Annuity Trust
- Pooled income fund
