= Dave Hawley =

English guitarist

David Hawley, better known as Dave Hawley, was an English prominent guitarist who was part of the late 1950s and 1960s Sheffield rock music scene. On his death, he was described as being "a leading light" and "an outstanding guitarist"; the Sheffield Star called him a "Sheffield music legend". Thom Jurek described him as "a lifelong Teddy Boy from the first generation of the Edwardian youth subculture in the '50, was a gone rockabilly cat who worshipped Gene Vincent (smart man) and played music his entire life".

He was the father of English singer-songwriter and guitarist Richard Hawley.

== Early years ==
Hawley grew up in Sheffield; his father was a music-hall musician and performer who had an act where he used to play the violin behind his back while he stood on his head. As a blues and country guitarist, Hawley first played in working men's clubs in the city whilst still under-age. His contemporaries while learning their trade in the clubs were Joe Cocker and Dave Berry.

== Success as an artist ==
As described by his son Richard, Hawley "had this three-finger claw-hammer style he learned from watching Earl Scruggs. He combined that with an R&B influence and came up with something really original".

Hawley later joined the Sheffield bands the Hillbilly Cats, the Black Cats, the Scott William Combo and the Cargills; the latter group, The Guardian described as being "years ahead of their time in their fusion of rock, country and blues".

Hawley met his future wife, Lynne, when he joined the Whirlwinds, another local band; Lynne and her sister Jean sang with the band. (Jean was subsequently to become the wife of guitarist Frank White, who, in the words of Hawley's son Richard, "in the '60s, was one of the best blues guitarists Sheffield had ever seen"). However, Hawley subsequently left when the other band members wanted a more commercial sound (replaced by ex Joe Cocker lead, Phil Crookes, they were to join Dave Berry's backing band The Cruisers), and he formed his own rockabilly band, called the Dave Hawley Combo; they were the resident group at The Esquire (now The Leadmill). In the book "Not Like a Proper Job: The Story of Popular Music in Sheffield 1955-1975 as Told by Those Who Made it", Hawley states, "I stuck rigidly to what I wanted to do".

Friend and fellow musician John Firminger (who in the 1970s was to play with Hawley in the Cargills) recounted how he first saw Hawley at the Esquire Club, when he walked in with Dave Berry: "I first met Dave [Hawley] when he was with the Scott William Combo... He had come through the skiffle group era, like a lot at that time. He had a real feel for bluegrass and rockabilly that few English musicians had... We were impressed with Dave straight away. In those days we could be a bit dismissive of musicians we didn't rate, but Dave stood out a mile. He had class".

In 1968, after seeing an advertisement in NME, Hawley left Sheffield for London and joined the Lorne Gibson Trio. After travelling down early on the milk train, the band left that same evening for a gig in an American air base. Hawley remained with the band for a year, earning £12 a night, during which time they toured Germany, Malta and the Middle East, and appeared on BBC Radio's Country Meets Folk.

At the age of 19, Hawley had played alongside Bill Monroe, who wrote "Blue Moon of Kentucky", and was commonly referred to as the 'Father of Bluegrass'. Hawley frequently put together 'pick-up bands' and played guitar with a host of top American blues artists when they toured the UK in the 1960s; these artists included such as Muddy Waters, Sonny Boy Williamson II, John Lee Hooker, Eddie Cochran, Memphis Slim and Little Walter. Hawley also played with Joe Cocker; they met when fitting radiators together for the gas board. They were to remain lifelong friends, and Cocker was godfather to Hawley's son, Richard.

== Family man ==
The birth of son Richard in January 1967 forced Hawley to return to a more settled life in Sheffield, where he continued to play part-time. He later had two daughters, Rebecca and Rachel.

At this time Hawley was a steelworker by day and played backing for the band Memphis Slim at night. Between the two, he taught his young son Richard Hawley to play the guitar; Hawley once caught his eight-year old playing his guitar in bed, when he should have been sleeping. On being asked about his inspirations, Richard later said: "The thing that I suppose set the initial spark was my dad. I'm always grateful for that. He was a steel worker but he spent whatever little time he had with me". Both his father and his uncle Frank White were to prove a great influence on his son, who later found success as a member of Britpop band Longpigs in the 1990s. This was followed by a short stint in the band Pulp, led by his Sheffield friend Jarvis Cocker. As a solo musician, son Richard Hawley has subsequently released eight studio albums and has been nominated for a Mercury Prize twice and once for a Brit Award.

Hawley and brother-in-law Frank White were avid record collectors, frequently visiting Bradley's record shop in Sheffield. Son Richard later recalled how "Mum and Dad had a really big record collection and I just used to sit and listen to them and absorb the music – it was like food and it still is... My dad was encouraging in a kind of bleak way. He said to me, 'You don't want to get to 60 with a voice like yours then look back and think, shit, I didn't even try'".

== Latter years ==
Hawley retired from the music scene in the late 1970s and worked as a turner at Woodhead Components in Sheffield.

Hawley and Lynne divorced in 1983, later living with his partner Frieda Schiefermair.

Hawley died on 7 March 2007 at St Luke's Hospice, aged 64, after suffering from long-term lung cancer. As a tribute, the album cover of son Richard's Lady's Bridge album, on which he was working at the time, and which was released later that same year, featured Richard in Sheffield's Club 60, on the stage where his father, some three decades previously, used to play. And following Hawley's death, Richard on occasion also wore his father's leather jacket on stage, such as on BBC TV's Later... with Jools Holland. Twelve years after his death, Richard commemorated his father with the song "My Little Treasures", which featured on his eighth studio album, Further.

== See also ==
- List of musicians from Sheffield
- List of rockabilly musicians
