= Judy Hawley =

American politician

Judy Hawley is an American politician.

Hawley graduated from Knox College in 1967. She was a teacher within the Gregory-Portland Independent School District as well as a tennis coach, prior to pursuing a political career. From 1995 to 2003, Hawley was a member of the Texas House of Representatives, occupying the 31st district seat as a Democrat. Hawley then served on the Corpus Christi Port Commission from 2004 until she was term-limited in 2016. She chaired the commission during the final two years of her tenure. In 2019, Hawley was elected to the Texas Transportation Hall of Honor.
