= George Snow Hill =

American painter and sculptor

George Snow Hill (1898–1969) was a painter and sculptor in the United States known as a muralist. He lived in St. Petersburg, Florida until his death in 1969. He founded the Hill School of Art in St. Petersburg in 1946.

== Early life and career ==
Hill was born in Munising, Michigan in 1898. He studied naval engineering and architecture at Lehigh University from 1917 until 1918, before graduating with a bachelor's degree in 1923 from Syracuse University where he met his wife Polly Knipp Hill. They studied in Paris together in the 1920s and were married there. She did etchings.

Hill went to Paris on a fellowship at the Académie Colarossi and the Académie de la Grande Chaumière, and had a studio in the city. His work was shown at the Salon des Artistes Francaise from 1923 until 1929, and he had a one-man exhibition at Simonson Galleries in Paris in 1924. In 1924, he also exhibited at the Royal Academy in London.

Hill returned to the United States in 1929, and worked as a portraitist in New York City before establishing a studio in St. Petersburg, Florida in 1932. His work was also part of the painting event in the art competition at the 1932 Summer Olympics.

Hill's works include the mural Long Staple Cotton in the Madison, Florida post office, commissioned by the Treasury Section of Fine Arts, and completed in 1937. He signed his paintings G.S. Hill.

== Controversial and lost work ==
Hill's style has been compared to that of Thomas Hart Benton, who was New Deal muralist as well as John Stuart Curry and Grant Wood. Hill's figures, like those in the Mannerist style, are elongated. His scenes include action. Some of his work was done for the Works Progress Administration. A commission for work in a Clearwater, Florida courtroom was stopped by Judge John U. Bird in 1934 because he did not want "pictures of sunbathers with brassiere-type bathing suits hanging over my bench." Another of his murals was torn down in 1966 by activist Joseph Waller because the mural of white sunbathers and black entertainers on the beach "depicts Negroes in a most despicable, derogatory manner." Further objections arose in 1998 over a bare breast in a mural at the Coast Guard station in St. Pete. Hill's painting at the Madison Post Office was also controversial when a postmaster raised concerns over the depiction of all-white supervisors and black workers alongside white workers.

Hill produced five murals for the Pinellas County Courthouse in Clearwater, Florida depicting county history. Hung in the Clearwater City Auditorium, they became lost after the building was razed in the 1960s. He did two St. Petersburg scenes of the pier and a picnic for City Hall. African-American community leaders later objected to the depictions of black musicians in Picnicking at Pass-a-Grille. After it was torn down, the painting was lost after the vandal's trial. He also painted a mural in the St. Petersburg Coast Guard building's wardroom depicting the service's history. A 1933 Chicago World's Fair painting moved to the Florida State Capitol was also lost, as well as murals for post offices in Florida and Alabama. Murals at Tampa's Peter O. Knight Airport were damaged when they were removed pending the airport's demolition. His aeronautical paintings included one showing Tony Jannus' famous flight from St. Petersburg to Tampa. Several of the murals have been restored and are on display at the Tampa International Airport.

== Personal life ==
George Snow Hill was married to Polly Knipp Hill, with whom he had a son named George Jr. His wife died in 1990.

Myers Fine Art and Auction House purchased George Snow Hill's estate in 1990.

== Work ==
- Paintings for the Ferargil Galleries in New York City in 1927 and 1929
- Paintings for the Syracuse Museum of Fine Arts, Syracuse, New York, 1927–32
- Painting at the J.B. Speed Art Museum, Louisville, Kentucky, 1928
- Pinellas County Courthouse/Clearwater Municipal Auditorium in Clearwater, Florida, 1934
- Coast Guard Station murals in St. Petersburg, Florida, 1937
- U.S. post office murals in Perry, Florida, 1940
- Mural of the St. John River for the Florida buildings at the Century of Progress Exhibition in Chicago, Illinois, 1933
- Cypress Logging (1938) for the Perry, Florida post office Hill painted this oil on canvas mural for the Treasury Section of Fine Arts in 1938. The panel honors the mostly African American laborers who contributed to the local lumber industry. It has since been restored.
- Murals for 1939 New York World's Fair
- Building the Tamiami Trail painting in the Wolfsonian Institute's permanent collection in Miami, Florida
- Work at the Smithsonian Institution, Washington, D.C.
- Work at the Georgia Museum of Art, Athens, Georgia
- Serenity
- Mural studies for the St. Louis post office competition, ca. 1939
- Loading Pulpwood A Section of Fine Arts mural for the 1941 Milton, Florida post office, later displayed at the Imogene Theater When a new post office was built, it was moved to the Santa Rosa Historical Society Museum. A fire there in the last few years, resulted in the mural being moved back to its original location in the old post office.
- Garden Cafeteria fresco mural of Florida flora and fauna, St. Petersburg (destroyed in August 2012 when the building was demolished)
- Long Staple Cotton Gin for the Madison, Florida post office
- Fishing at the Pier and Picnicking at Pass-a-Grille for St. Petersburg City Hall. The murals were commissioned by Mayor Walfred Lindstrom and the St. Petersburg City Council in 1940 under a federal art project of the WPA, but World War II terminated the project. Hill, however, continued to work on the murals at his own expense and donated them to the City when he was finished.
- Stained glass window at St. Bartholomew's Episcopal Church, 34th Street South in St. Petersburg, Florida
