= Justice Hawley =

Justice Hawley may refer to:

- Cyrus M. Hawley (1815–1894), associate justice of the Territorial Utah Supreme Court
- Thomas Porter Hawley (1830–1907), associate justice of the Supreme Court of Nevada
