= Scott Munsterman =

American politician

Scott Donald Munsterman (born February 24, 1961) is a former mayor of Brookings, South Dakota. Munsterman sought the Republican nomination for governor of South Dakota in the South Dakota gubernatorial election in 2010. In a Republican primary election on June 8, 2010, Munsterman came in second to Lt. Gov. Dennis Daugaard. Munsterman received 17.6% or 14,733 of the 83,832 ballots cast, approximately one third of the 50% received by Daugaard.

== Before gubernatorial campaign ==
Munsterman had been part of the Brookings City Council since 2001, and he had served as mayor for six years until 2009. Prior to running for city council, Munsterman was a chiropractor. He is married to Mary Jeanne Munsterman, and they have five daughters and two grandchildren. According to the American Chiropractic Association, no chiropractor has ever been elected governor of South Dakota.

== Gubernatorial campaign ==
Munsterman made education one of his biggest talking points on the gubernatorial campaign trail in 2009 and said he would reform public education in South Dakota by consolidating school districts and eliminating redundancies by suggesting there might not be a need for one superintendent per district. Munsterman is strongly pro-life, and claims that he is "not sure what the litmus test is for conservatives these days". During Munsterman's gubernatorial campaign, he met at least once with local ethanol producers, and assured them that, if elected, he would share their priorities.

== Views on health care ==
Munsterman is opposed to government sponsored health care, and has described pending federal medical insurance plans as a "double-barrelled shotgun point right at us". Munsterman has also described federal medical insurance legislation as a "runaway health care train". He believes that medicaid recipients should exercise "more personal responsibility."

== Legislative career ==
In 2010, Munsterman was elected to the South Dakota State Legislature, where, in 2011, he served as vice-chair of the health and human services committee and as a member of the local government committee. In January 2011, Munsterman cosponsored South Dakota Senate Bill 165, which aims to "reduce by ten percent the small school adjustment in the state aid to education formula, and to appropriate the money saved by the state as a result of the reduction to fund the education service agencies." Also in January 2011, Munsterman cosponsored South Dakota Senate Bill 79, which would "provide for the application of LEAN techniques to certain state government processes and to provide for prioritization and oversight of the lean government program." One of the stated goals of this law would be to "align work processes, identify problematic issues, and streamline the process."

Munsterman was also a cosponsor of HB 1193, which makes it illegal for townships in South Dakota to restrict the "possession, transportation, sale, transfer, ownership, manufacture, or repair of firearms or ammunition or their components" and continues on to state that "any ordinances existing restrictions prohibited by this section are null and void." Coincidentally, in 2011 the South Dakota State Legislature overturned governor Daugaard's veto of House Bill 1146, which prevents health insurers from charging higher copayments for patients' visits to chiropractors than they do for patients' visits to medical doctors. Despite the fact that Munsterman is himself a doctor of chiropractic, he seems to have voted on the bill.

Munsterman has written a book, A Vision for South Dakota, which is freely distributed on his website. In this book, Munsterman delineates the manner in which South Dakota, after its coming resurgence, will lead the United States into the twenty-first century. For instance, he states:

However, we currently stand on the brink of losing our opportunity to catch the next train ... it is just now departing the station. This train is representative of the knowledge-based economy and as of today, we have yet to purchase our tickets.

== Bibliography ==
- Munsterman, Scott (2009). A Vision for South Dakota (PDF). Sioux Falls: Pine Hill Press. ISBN 978-1-57579-404-4.
