= Pooled income fund =

The Pooled Income Fund (PIF) is a type of charitable mutual fund or charitable trust that pools the securities or cash separately donated by an individual, a family or a corporation to a charity, which is then invested to provide dividends for both the donor's beneficiary and charity. The donations are irrevocable and tax-deductible and must be from personal assets. Capital gains taxes do not apply to securities donated to such a fund. The Pooled Income Fund was created by the Tax Reform Act of 1969 and is governed by IRS Section 642(c)(5).

After a donor dies, the balance of their donation is given to a predetermined qualified 501(c)(3) charitable organization (or several organizations). Charities typically manage their own pooled income fund, and fund their operations through the donated securities.

== History ==
Created in 1969, the Pooled Income Fund (PIF) grew in popularity during its first two decades. In the 1970s and 1980s, when rates on intermediate-term bonds were well into double digits, PIF managers were able to invest in a combination of stocks and bonds that enabled long-term preservation and growth in principal as well as income payouts up to 10 or 12 percent during those decades.

In the late 1980s and into the next two decades, as the bond rates began and continued to spiral down, the resulting PIF payout rates for declined as well, with some falling below 3% in the new millennium. While a PIF might pay 3%, the standard recommended Charitable Gift Annuities payout rate for a 70-year-old was above 5%. The number of PIF forms (Form 5227) filed with the IRS declined 67% in 7 years, from 4,571 in 2001 to 1,488 in 2008.

When interest rates reached their historic lows, around 2020, the Pooled Income Fund market began to reemerge with the establishment of new PIFs -- any PIF in existence for less than three taxable years preceding the year of contribution -- with the possibility of locking in large charitable deductions as well as reaping enhanced income payout rates, in comparison with other split-interest charitable vehicles, like charitable remainder trust or charitable gift annuity.

== See also ==
- Investment fund
