= Allen Hawley =

American fundraising administrator

Allen F. Hawley (September 26, 1893 – November 13, 1978) was an American fundraising administrator best known for developing the Pomona Plan, a pioneering deferred giving scheme, for Pomona College.

== Life and career ==
Hawley grew up on a ranch in El Cajon, California. He attended San Diego High School and then worked on the ranch for a year before enrolling at Pomona College, from which he graduated in 1916. He then attended Harvard Business School, but dropped out to serve as an ambulance driver in France during World War I. After the war, he worked as an assistant director at Fox Film in Hollywood and on the advertising staff of the Los Angeles Examiner.

In 1938, he returned to work for Pomona, and in 1942 he introduced the Pomona Plan, a deferred giving scheme through which members receive a lifetime annuity in exchange for donating to the college upon their death. The plan enabled Pomona to substantially increase its endowment, and its model has since been adopted by many other institutions.

Hawley retired from Pomona in 1962 as a vice president. That year, the college awarded him an honorary doctor of law degree. He died in 1978 at a nursing home in Hemet, California.
