= Charitable gift annuity =

Charitable investment instrument

A charitable gift annuity is a gift vehicle that falls into the category of planned giving. It involves a contract between a donor and a charity, whereby the donor transfers assets, such as cash or securities, to the charity in exchange for a partial tax deduction and a lifetime stream of periodic income from the charity. When the donor dies, the charity keeps the remaining assets.

The amount of the income stream is determined by many factors, including the donor's age and the policy of the charity. Most charities in the United States use payout rates recommended by the American Council on Gift Annuities.

== How it works ==
Here's how it typically works:

- The donor contributes assets, such as cash or securities, to a charitable organization.
- In exchange for the contribution, the organization agrees to make regular fixed payments to the donor for the remainder of their life. The income stream (annuity) can be set up to provide payments to a single individual (annuitant) or to two individuals (joint annuitants).
- The donor is eligible for an immediate charitable income tax deduction based on the value of the charitable gift portion of the contribution. It is the difference between the fair market value of the contributed assets and the present value of the annuity payments. The annuity payments is calculated based on factors such as the donor's age, the annuity payout rate, and prevailing interest rates. The start date of the annuity payments is most commonly immediate; if the charity so offers, it may be deferred to a later date chosen by the donor, or left flexible in the contract.
- Upon the death of the annuitant(s), the remaining value of the assets (residuum) is retained by the charitable organization for its charitable purposes.
