= Senator Hawley (disambiguation) =

Josh Hawley (born 1979) is a United States senator from Missouri.

Senator Hawley may refer to:

- Charles Hawley (1792–1866), Connecticut State Senate
- Joseph R. Hawley (1826–1905), U.S. Senator from Connecticut from 1881 to 1905

== See also ==
- Senator Haley (disambiguation)
