= Carl Tracy Hawley =

American artist

Carl Tracy Hawley (1873 - 1945) was an educator, painter, illustrator, and sculptor in the United States. He was born in Montrose, Pennsylvania in 1873. He studied architecture at Cornell University and received a B.P. and M.P. from Syracuse University in 1894 and 1911 respectively. He was also educated at the Art Students' League in New York City, Académie Julian in Paris, France and Académie Colarossi in Paris.

In 1895 Hawley began teaching painting at Syracuse University becoming an Associate Professor and Professor of Drawing, Illustration and Art Anatomy. He received an Honorary Master of Painting from Syracuse University in 1915.

Hawley married Janet P. Sterling in 1921 and they had a son, Carl S. Hawley, in 1922.

He illustrated History in Rhymes and Jingles, Verses by Prof. Alexander C. Flick

Hawley died in Syracuse, New York in 1945. A collection of his papers are in Syracuse University's special collections.
