= Larry Tidemann =

American politician (born 1948)

Member of the South Dakota Senate from the 7th district
- In office January 11, 2011 – January 5, 2019
- Preceded by: Pam Merchant
- Succeeded by: V. J. Smith

Member of the South Dakota House of Representatives from the 7th district
- In office January 2005 – January 11, 2011
- Preceded by: Orville Smidt

Personal details
- Born: April 13, 1948 (age 78) Sioux Falls, South Dakota, U.S.
- Party: Republican
- Education: South Dakota State University

Larry J. Tidemann (born April 13, 1948, in Sioux Falls, South Dakota) is a former American politician and a former Republican member of the South Dakota Senate representing District 7 from 2011 to 2019. Tidemann served consecutively in the South Dakota Legislature from January 2005 until January 11, 2011, in the South Dakota House of Representatives District 7 seat.

== Education ==
Tidemann earned his BS and MS from the South Dakota State University.

== Elections ==
=== State House of Representatives ===
- 2004 When House District 7 incumbent Republican Representative Orville Smidt ran for South Dakota Senate, Tidemann and incumbent Republican Representative Sean O'Brien were unopposed for the June 1, 2004 Republican Primary and won the four-way November 2, 2004 General election where Representative O'Brien took the first seat and Tidemann took the second seat with 4,696 votes (27.81%) ahead of Democratic nominees Roger Prunty and Rich Widman, who had run for the seat in 2000.
- 2006 When House District 7 incumbent Republican Representative O'Brien left the Legislature and left a District 7 seat open, Tidemann and Carol Pitts were unopposed for the June 6, 2006 Republican Primary and won the four-way November 7, 2006 General election where fellow Republican nominee Pitts took the first seat by 11 votes and Tidemann took the second seat with 4,585 votes (32.08%) ahead of Democratic nominees Robert Klein and Joshua Horton.
- 2008 Tidemann and incumbent Republican Representative Pitts were again unopposed for the June 3, 2008 Republican Primary, and won the four-way November 4, 2008 General election where Tidemann took the first seat with 5,428 votes (32.05%) and incumbent Representative Pitts took the second seat ahead of Democratic nominees Steve Binkley and Abigail Howell.
- 2010 To challenge Senate District 7 incumbent Democratic Senator Pam Merchant, Tidemann was unopposed for the June 8, 2010 Republican Primary and won the November 2, 2010 General election with 4,289 votes (54.15%) against Democratic Senator Merchant.

=== State Senate ===
- 2012 Tidemann and Democratic former Senator Pam Merchant were both unopposed for their June 5, 2012 primaries, setting up a rematch; Tidemann won the November 6, 2012 General election with 4,362 votes (53.52%) against Senator Merchant.
