= Charitable Remainder Annuity Trust =

A Charitable Remainder Annuity Trust (CRAT) is a Planned Giving vehicle defined in §664 of the United States Internal Revenue Code that entails a donor placing a major gift of cash or property into an irrevocable trust. The trust then pays a fixed amount of income each year to the donor or the donor's specified beneficiary. When the donor dies, the remainder of the trust is transferred to the charity.

Charitable trusts such as a CRAT require a trustee. Sometimes the charity is named as trustee, other times it is a third party such as an attorney, a bank or a financial advisor.
