= Wilhelm, Prince of Löwenstein-Wertheim-Freudenberg =

Wilhelm
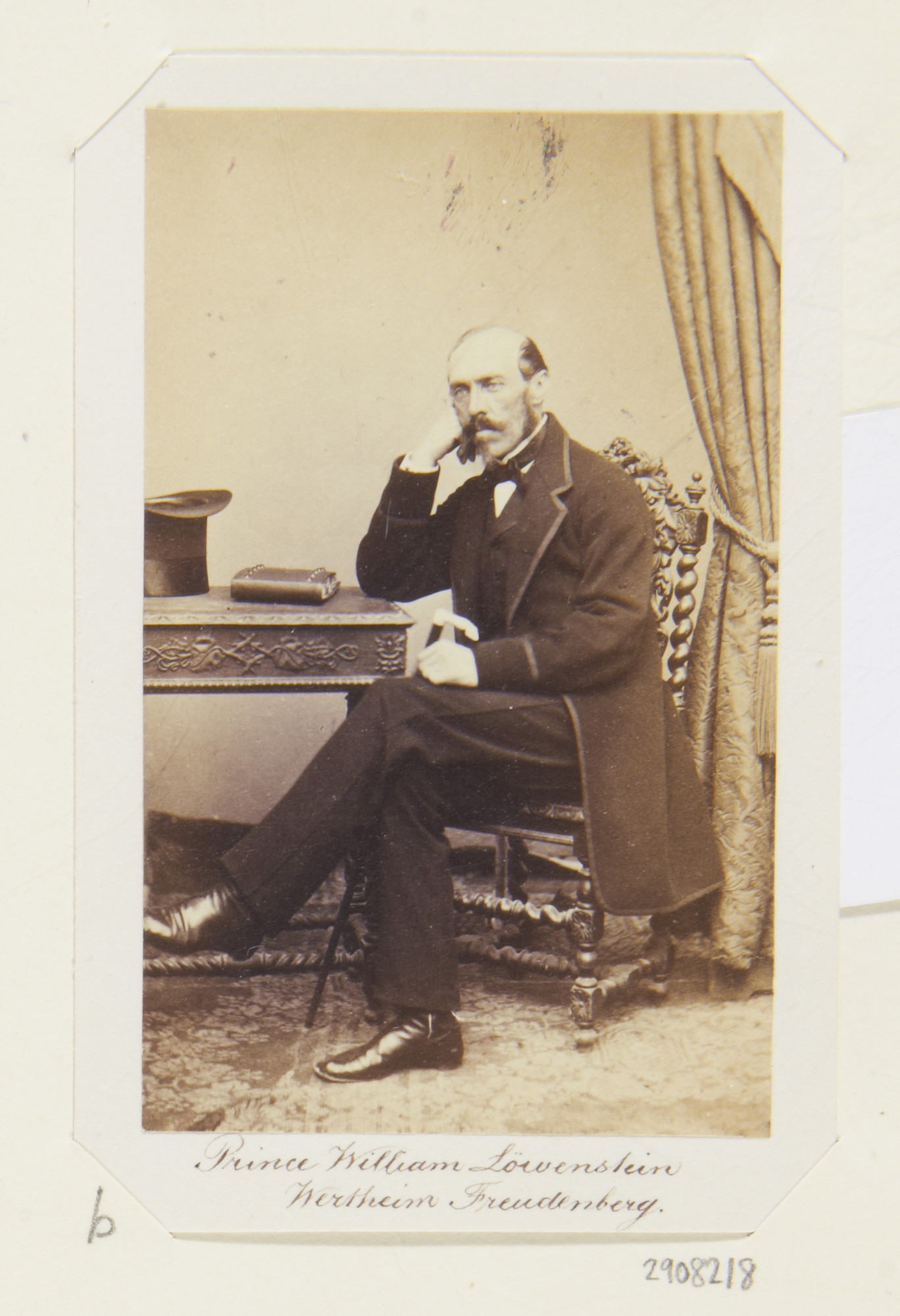

4th Prince of Löwenstein-Wertheim-Freudenberg
- Reign: 1861–1887
- Predecessor: Prince Adolf of Löwenstein-Wertheim-Freudenberg
- Successor: Prince Ernest Alban of Löwenstein-Wertheim-Freudenberg
- Born: 19 March 1817; Stuttgart
- Died: 10 March 1887 (aged 69); Karlsruhe, German Empire
- Spouse: Countess Olga Clara of Schönburg-Glauchau; Bertha Hagen
- Issue: Prince Ludwig
Names
- William Paul Louis of Löwenstein-Wertheim-Freudenberg; German: Wilhelm Paul Ludwig zu Löwenstein-Wertheim-Freudenberg
- House: Löwenstein-Wertheim-Freudenberg
- Father: Count William of Löwenstein-Wertheim-Freudenberg
- Mother: Dorothy Christine von Kahlden
- Religion: Roman Catholic

Wilhelm Paul Ludwig, Prince of Löwenstein-Wertheim-Freudenberg (German: Wilhelm Paul Ludwig Prinz zu Löwenstein-Wertheim-Freudenberg; 19 March 1817 – 10 March 1887) was a member of the princely house of Löwenstein-Wertheim-Freudenberg. He became the fourth Prince of Löwenstein-Wertheim-Freudenberg in 1861.

== Early life ==
Wilhelm was born on 19 March 1817 in Stuttgart, Germany, as the eldest son of Prince Wilhelm of Löwenstein-Wertheim-Freudenberg (1783–1847) and his wife, Dorothea Christine von Kahlden (1791–1860). Wilhelm received a humanistic education by private teachers, and he studied science at the University of Bonn. He also studied law, political economy, philosophy, and art history. His friend from this time of studies was Prince Albert of Saxe-Coburg and Gotha, who became the husband of Queen Victoria.

== Career ==
In 1861, Wilhelm became the reigning prince of Löwenstein-Wertheim-Freudenberg upon the death of his predecessor, Prince Adolf of Löwenstein-Wertheim-Freudenberg (1805–1861).

== Personal life ==
Wilhelm married Countess Olga Clara von Schönburg-Glauchau (1831–1868) on 20 April 1852 in Pillnitz bei Dresden. She was a daughter of Karl Heinrich Alban Graf und Herr von Schönburg-Forderglauchau (1804–1864) and his wife, Countess Amalie von Jenison-Walworth (youngest daughter of Count Franz von Jenison-Walworth). Before the death of his first wife in 1868, they were the parents of nine children together:

- Ernst Alban Ludwig, Prince of Löwenstein-Wertheim-Freudenberg (1854–1931), who married Wanda, Countess of Wylich and Lottum, youngest daughter of Wilhelm Malte II, in 1886.
- Alfred, Prince of Löwenstein-Wertheim-Freudenberg (1855–1925), who married Pauline, Countess of Reichenbach-Lessonitz, daughter of Wilhelm, Count of Reichenbach-Lessonitz (a younger son of William II, Elector of Hesse and Emilie Ortlöpp), in 1880.
- Vollrath, Prince of Löwenstein-Wertheim-Freudenberg (1856–1919)
- Karl, Prince of Löwenstein-Wertheim-Freudenberg (1858–1928)
- Friedrich Ernst Ludwig, Prince of Löwenstein-Wertheim-Freudenberg (1860–1920), who married Hedwig Aloysia Muller, daughter of Anton Muller, in 1890.
- Marie, Princess of Löwenstein-Wertheim-Freudenberg (1861–1941), who married Friedrich Count of Lippe-Biesterfeld in 1882.
- Wilhelm Gustav Ludwig, Prince of Löwenstein-Wertheim-Freudenberg (1863–1915), who married his cousin, Luise Baroness von Fabrice, daughter of Bernhard, Baron von Fabrice and Ida, Countess von Schönburg-Glauchau, in 1887.
- Ludwig, Prince of Löwenstein-Wertheim-Freudenberg (1864–1899), who married Lady Anne Savile, daughter of John Savile, 4th Earl of Mexborough, in 1897.
- Adele, Princess of Löwenstein-Wertheim-Freudenberg (1866–1890), who married Gustav Biron von Kirland in 1885.

After the death of his first wife, Wilhelm married again. His second wife was Bertha Hagen (1845–1895).

On 10 March 1887, Wilhelm died at the age of 69.

== Honours and awards ==
- Knight of Honour of the Johanniter Order, 21 October 1847
- Knight of the Order of the Red Eagle, 1st Class, 5 October 1867
- Grand Cross of the Order of the Zähringer Lion, 1864

== Bibliography ==
- Franz Bosbach. Die Studien des Prinzen Albert an der Universität Bonn (1837–1838), Verlag: Saur K.G. Verlag Gmbh 2009, ISBN 3-5982-3004-4.
- Stanley Weintraub. Albert: Uncrowned King, London 1997, ISBN 0-7195-5756-9.
