= Alban von Schönburg-Forderglauchau =

German aristocart

- Count of Schönburg-Forderglauchau
- Predecessor: Wilhelm Albrecht Heinrich von Schönburg-Forderglauchau
- Successor: Karl von Schönburg-Glauchau
- Full name: German: Karl Heinrich Alban Graf von Schönburg-Glauchau
- Born: 18 November 1804; Dresden-Neustadt, Electorate of Saxony
- Died: 23 March 1864 (aged 59); Dresden, Kingdom of Saxony
- Spouse: Countess Christiane Mary Emilie von Jenison-Walworth (m. 1824; died 1864)
- Father: Wilhelm Albrecht Heinrich, Count of Schönburg-Forderglauchau
- Mother: Anna Albertine Leopoldine Wilhelmine von Wartensleben

Karl Heinrich Alban, Count of Schönburg-Forderglauchau (11 November 1804 – 23 March 1864) was the head of the mediatised German Counts of Schönburg-Glauchau from 1815 until his death in 1864.

== Early life ==
Schönburg was born in Dresden-Neustadt in the Electorate of Saxony on 11 November 1804. He was the eldest son of Count Wilhelm Albrecht Heinrich von Schönburg-Forderglauchau (1762–1815) and Countess Anna Albertine Leopoldine Wilhelmine von Wartensleben (1775–1826). His younger brother was Ernst Ferdinand Heinrich von Schönburg-Forderglauchau.

His paternal grandfather was Count Karl Heinrich von Schönburg-Forderglauchau (1729–1800) and Countess Christiane Wilhelmine von Einsiedel.

== Career ==
Upon his father's death in 1815, he became head of the Schönburg-Forderglauchau branch of the family.

== Personal life ==
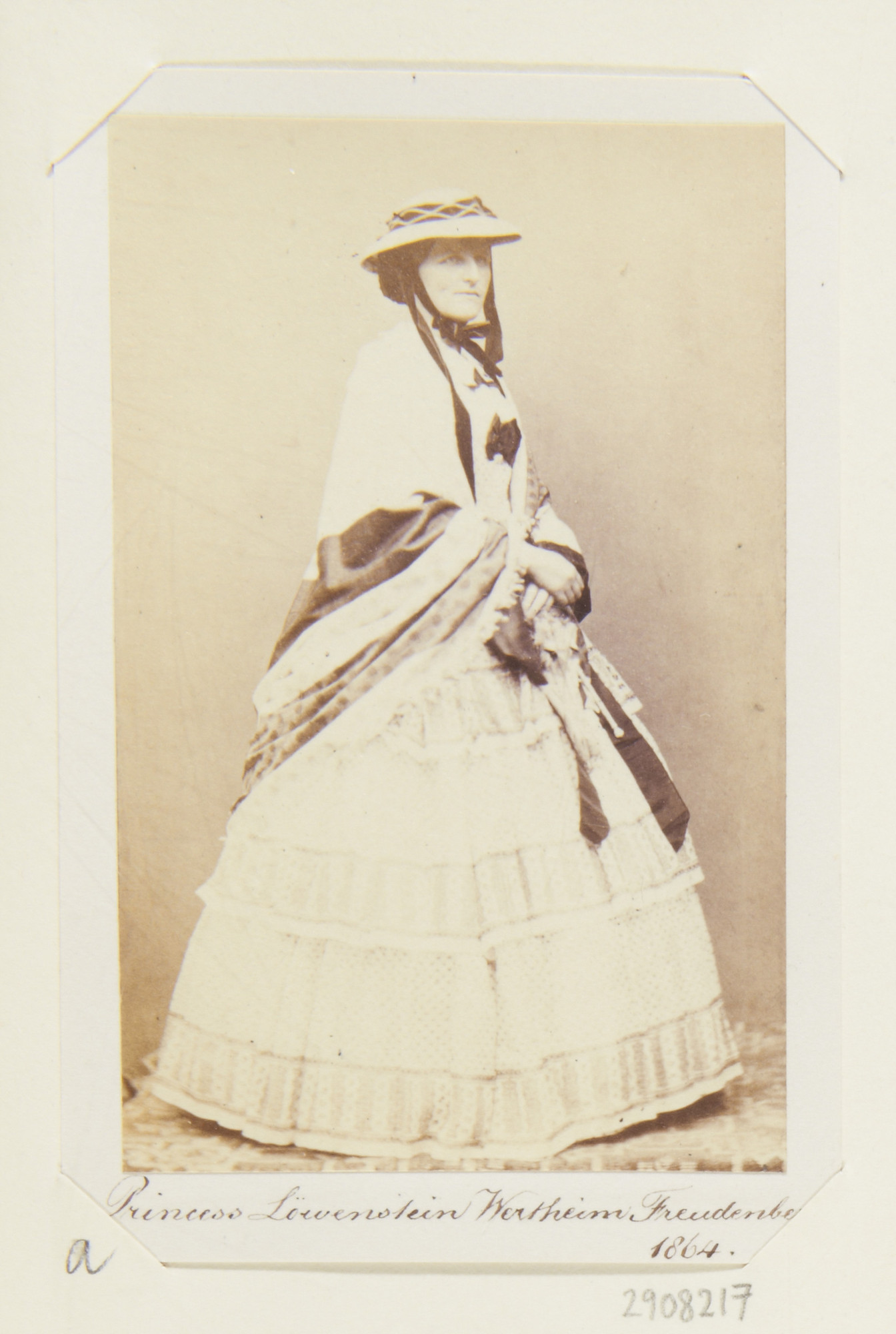
Photograph of his daughter, Olga-Claire, Princess consort.

In 1824, he was married to the Countess Christiane Mary Emilie von Jenison-Walworth (1806–1880), a daughter of Count Franz von Jenison-Walworth and, his second wife, the former Mary Beauclerk (a daughter of Topham Beauclerk, who was himself a great-grandson of King Charles II, and Lady Diana Spencer, a daughter of the 3rd Duke of Marlborough). Together, they were the parents of five children:

- Marie Emillie zu Schönburg-Forderglauchau (1825–1869), who married Bavarian Reichsrat Count Otto von Quadt-Wykradt-Isny in 1846. He was brother to Count Friedrich von Quadt-Wykradt-Isny, the Bavarian Envoy to France.
- Karl Heinrich von Schönburg-Forderglauchau (1826–1826), who died young.
- Ida von Schönburg-Forderglauchau (1829–1902), who married Baron Bernhard von Fabrice in 1853.
- Olga-Claire von Schönburg-Forderglauchau (1831–1868), who married Wilhelm, Prince of Löwenstein-Wertheim-Freudenberg in 1852.
- Karl von Schönburg-Glauchau (1832–1898), who married Countess Adelheid von Rechteren-Limpurg-Speckfeld, a daughter of Friedrich Ludwig von Rechteren-Limpurg-Speckfeld, in 1864. After her death in 1873, he married Countess Sophie d'Ursel, a daughter of Léon, 5th Duke d'Ursel (and sister to Charles Joseph Marie, 6th Duke d'Ursel), in 1879.

Schönburg died in Dresden on 23 March 1864.

=== Descendants ===
Through his daughter Olga, he was a grandfather of Prince Ludwig of Löwenstein-Wertheim-Freudenberg, who married Lady Anne Savile, daughter of John Savile, 4th Earl of Mexborough.
