= Prince Ludwig of Löwenstein-Wertheim-Freudenberg =

German noble (1864–1899)

Prince Ludwig
- Born: 19 July 1864; Kreuzwertheim, Kingdom of Bavaria
- Died: 26 March 1899 (aged 34); Furageros, Philippine Republic
- Spouse: Lady Anne Savile (m. 1897)
- House: Löwenstein-Wertheim-Freudenberg
- Father: Wilhelm, Prince of Löwenstein-Wertheim-Freudenberg
- Mother: Countess Olga of Schönburg-Glauchau

Prince Ludwig Karl of Löwenstein-Wertheim-Freudenberg (German: Ludwig Karl Prinz zu Löwenstein-Wertheim-Freudenberg) (19 July 1864 – 26 March 1899) was a London socialite who became known for his mysterious disappearance, and subsequent reappearance in the Philippines during the Spanish–American War in which he was killed during fighting between Emilio Aguinaldo-led insurgents and the United States Army at the Battle of Caloocan of the Philippine–American War. Ludwig was a prince of Löwenstein-Wertheim-Freudenberg and a member of the Princely House of Löwenstein-Wertheim-Freudenberg.

== Family ==
Ludwig was born on 19 July 1864 in Kreuzwertheim, Kingdom of Bavaria and was the eighth child and sixth son of Wilhelm, Prince of Löwenstein-Wertheim-Freudenberg and his first wife, Countess Olga Clara of Schönburg-Forderglauchau, a daughter of Count Alban von Schönburg-Forderglauchau.

== Marriage ==
Ludwig married Lady Anne Savile, daughter of John Savile, 4th Earl of Mexborough, and his second wife. Agnes Louisa Elizabeth Raphael, on 15 May 1897 in London. Anne and Ludwig were distantly related (7th cousins), as both were descendants of Sir Henry Garraway, who served as Lord Mayor of London.

== Disappearance to the Philippines ==
=== Spanish–American War ===
Ludwig disappeared from London society in 1898 prompting his friends to run an advertisement in London newspapers inquiring about his whereabouts. After much speculation, a telegram from Manila published in March 1899 revealed the prince had been in Manila for many months and was present at the destruction of Patricio Montojo's Spanish naval fleet during the Battle of Manila Bay in the Spanish–American War. While in Manila, Ludwig was suspected of acting as a "confidential agent" of the German government. Prior to the surrender of Manila, Ludwig was allegedly permitted to cross in and out of Spanish and insurgent lines, as each side regarded him as friendly. Ludwig also allegedly served as "a voluntary aide-de-camp" and interpreter to a General Miller, though he was never connected with the United States Army.

=== Philippine–American War ===
Ludwig was among several civilians observing the progress of the Battle of Caloocan, fought between insurgents led by Emilio Aguinaldo and the Oregon Volunteers, soldiers of the United States Army, from a stone bridge over the Malabon River near Furageros on 26 March 1899. Ludwig and the other spectators were then warned by an orderly that they were in danger in their current position. The orderly addressed Ludwig directly: "I am speaking to you particularly. You have already given us some trouble by hanging around the firing line, and we will have no more of it." According to fellow civilian spectator C. S. Bradford in The New York Times, Ludwig and a companion left the position and disappeared into the nearby forest which later became the scene of fighting. Oregon Volunteers soldiers were ordered to fire upon the houses in the woods, in one of which was Ludwig. A bullet fired by an Oregonian soldier entered Ludwig's right side, killing him instantly. Bradford and two others took charge of Ludwig's body. A passport found on Ludwig's person was signed by Aguinaldo confirming that he had been granted permission to enter the lines of the insurgents at will. C. S. Bradford recounted these events to The New York Times upon his return from the Philippines to his home in San Francisco, California in May 1899. Ludwig's date of death was also confirmed by the Oregon Volunteers in their official account of the war published in 1902.

== Ancestry ==
Ancestors of Prince Ludwig of Löwenstein-Wertheim-Freudenberg

8. Johann Karl, Prince of Löwenstein-Wertheim-Virneburg
4. Prince Wilhelm of Löwenstein-Wertheim-Freudenberg
9. Princess Dorothea Maria of Hesse-Philippsthal-Barchfeld
2. Wilhelm, Prince of Löwenstein-Wertheim-Freudenberg
10. Hans Adam von Kahlden
5. Dorothea Christine von Kahlden
11. Sophie Beata von Zeppelin
1. Prince Ludwig of Löwenstein-Wertheim-Freudenberg
12. Wilhelm Albrecht Heinrich, Count of Schönburg-Forderglauchau
6. Karl Heinrich Alban, Count of Schönburg-Forderglauchau
13. Countess Albertine of Wartensleben
3. Countess Olga Clara of Schönburg-Forderglauchau
14. Count Franz von Jenison-Walworth
7. Countess Amalie Jenison of Walworth
15. Mary Day Beauclerk
