= John Savile, 4th Earl of Mexborough =

British peer and politician

Arms of Savile: Argent, on a bend sable three owls of the field

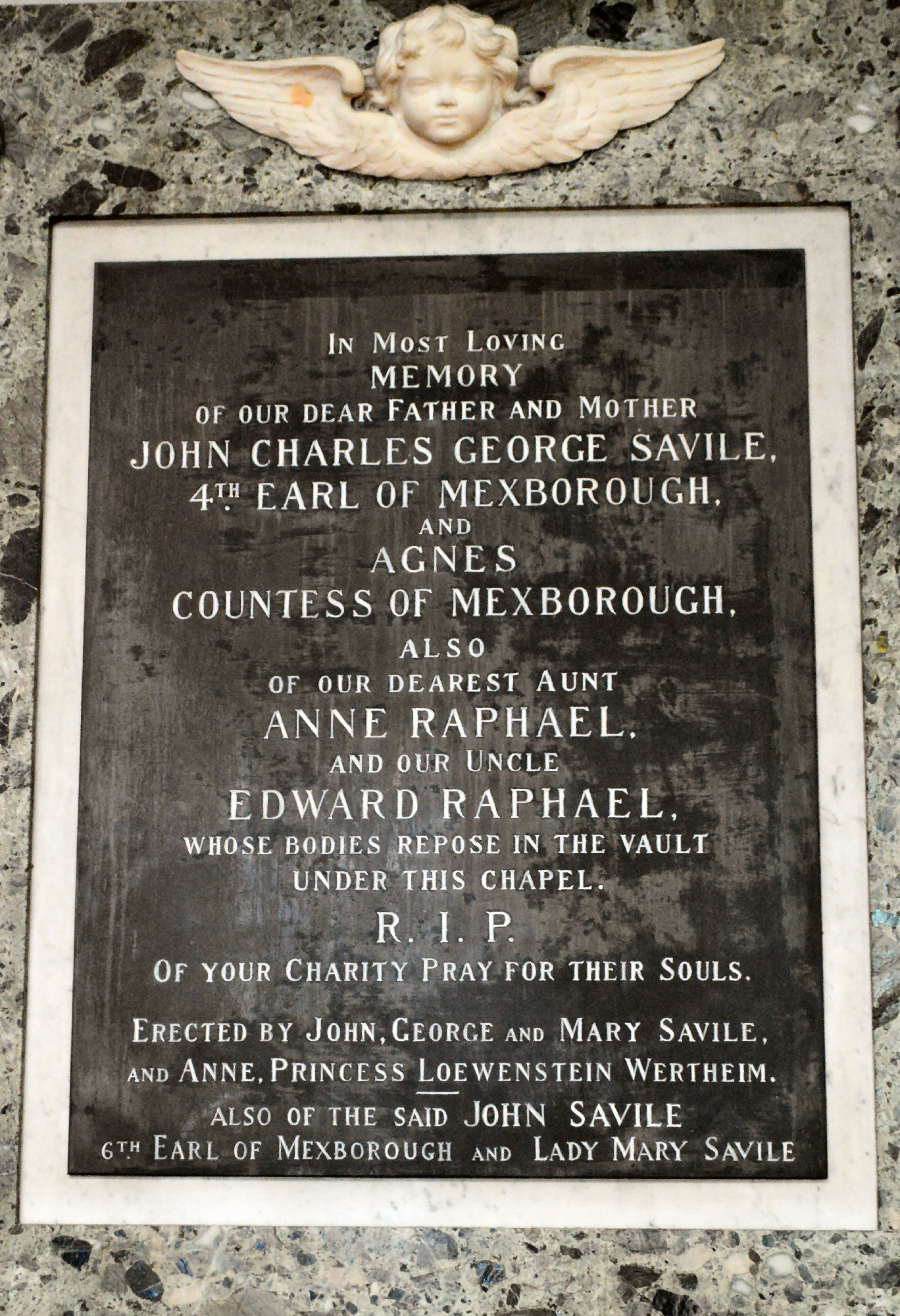
Monument in St Raphael's Church, Surbiton, Surrey, to John Savile, 4th Earl Mexborough

John Charles George Savile, 4th Earl of Mexborough (4 June 1810 – 17 August 1899), styled Viscount Pollington between 1830 and 1860, was a British peer and Tory politician. He impressed his friends enough to be twice fictionalised, and at his death he was the last surviving person to have been elected a Member of the House of Commons before the passing of the Reform Act in 1832.

== Origins ==
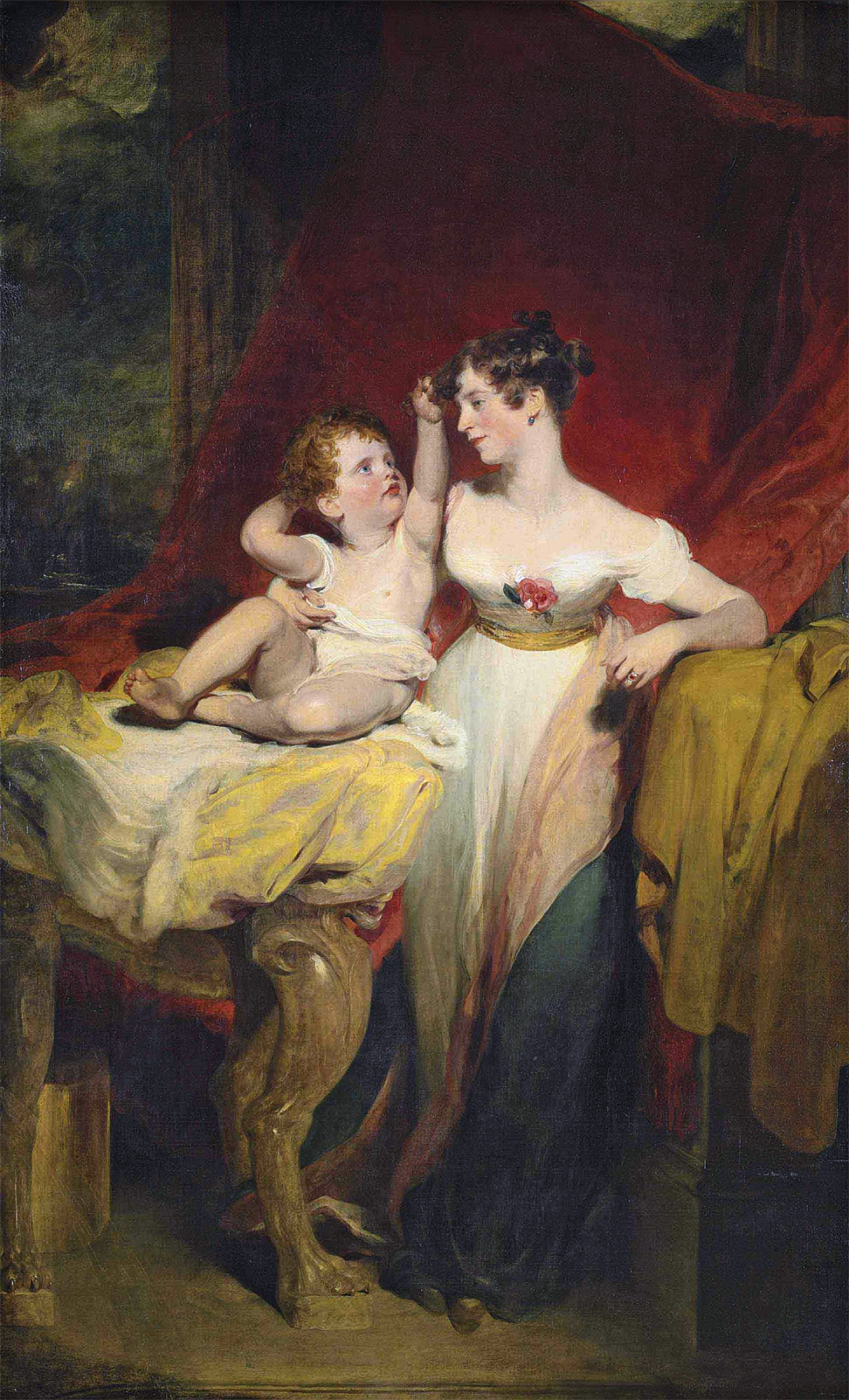
John Savile, the future 4th Earl of Mexborough, with his mother Lady Anne Yorke (1783 - 1870), (then Viscountess Pollington, later Countess of Mexborough). Portrait by Thomas Lawrence, Moretti Fine Art collection, London

He was the son and heir of John Savile, 3rd Earl of Mexborough by his wife Lady Anne Yorke (1783 - 1870), a daughter of Philip Yorke, 3rd Earl of Hardwicke by his wife Elizabeth Lindsay, a daughter of James Lindsay, 5th Earl of Balcarres.

== Career ==
At Eton College between 1821 and 1826, he was renowned for his abilities in the classics, and also enjoyed boxing; Savile was said to have entertained contemporaries at one boxing match by "strutting around the ring, spouting Homer" between rounds. From there he went to Trinity College, Cambridge in 1827–8.

Pollington was returned to Parliament for the rotten borough of Gatton in 1831, a borough under the control of his cousin, Frederick Monson, 5th Baron Monson. At the time of his election he was under-age but Parliament did not meet until after his 21st birthday. Pollington voted consistently against the Reform Bill and also voted to end the grant to the Roman Catholic Maynooth College. Gatton was among the boroughs disfranchised by the Reform Act, and Pollington did not attempt to find an alternative constituency at the 1832 general election.

After leaving Parliament, Pollington went on an extensive foreign tour of Russia, Persia and India. In 1834 he joined his Eton contemporary Alexander William Kinglake on an expedition through the Ottoman Empire. Kinglake's travelogue "Eothen" includes a character called Methley who is based on Pollington: Methley is a knowledgeable classical scholar with "the practical sagacity of a Yorkshireman".

Pollington returned to Britain in 1835, in time for his election as Member of Parliament for Pontefract as a supporter of Sir Robert Peel at the general election.

Pollington sat out the Parliament of 1837–1841, and took the opportunity to travel through eastern Anatolia in June 1838. His journal from this trip was published as "Notes on a Journey from Erẓ-Rúm ... to Aleppo" in the Journal of the Royal Geographical Society in 1841. On his return to Britain, Pollington again represented Pontefract between 1841 and 1847.

He was nominated as a candidate in a byelection in the borough in 1851, in his absence and without his knowledge. Pollington became a close friend of Benjamin Disraeli, and shortly after he married the "very wild and gay" Lady Rachel Walpole, daughter of Horatio Walpole, 3rd Earl of Orford in 1842, Disraeli featured the couple as 'Lord and Lady Gaverstock' in his novel Coningsby. Tragically Pollington's first wife died in June 1854.

== Peerage ==
In 1860 he succeeded his father in the earldom. However, as this was an Irish peerage it did not entitle him to a seat in the House of Lords.

== Marriages and children ==
He married twice:

- Firstly in 1842 to Lady Rachel Katherine Walpole, a daughter of Horatio Walpole, 3rd Earl of Orford, by whom he had issue including:
  - John Horace Savile, 5th Earl of Mexborough (1843–1916), eldest son and heir.
- Secondly, in July 1861 at St Mary's, Bryanston Square, London, he married Agnes Louisa Elizabeth Raphael (d. 23 December 1898), a Roman Catholic and a daughter of John Raphael. In 1894 he converted to the Roman Catholic faith of his wife.
  - Lady Anne Saville aviation enthusiast who became Princess Anne of Löwenstein-Wertheim-Freudenberg (as wife of Prince Ludwig of Löwenstein-Wertheim-Freudenberg).

== Death and succession ==
He died in Brighton in August 1899, aged 89, having survived his wife by only a few months. At the time of his death he was the last survivor from the pre-1832 Reform Act House of Commons. He was succeeded in the earldom by his son from his first marriage, John Horace Savile, 5th Earl of Mexborough (1843–1916).

Parliament of the United Kingdom
Preceded by John Shelley; John Thomas Hope	Member of Parliament for Gatton; 1831–1832; With: Anthony John Ashley	Constituency abolished
Preceded by Hon. Henry Stafford-Jerningham; John Gully	Member of Parliament for Pontefract; 1835–1837; With: John Gully	Succeeded by Richard Monckton Milnes; William Stanley-Massey-Stanley
Preceded by Richard Monckton Milnes; William Stanley-Massey-Stanley	Member of Parliament for Pontefract; 1841–1847; With: Richard Monckton Milnes	Succeeded by Richard Monckton Milnes; Samuel Martin
Peerage of Ireland
Preceded by John Savile	Earl of Mexborough; 1860–1899	Succeeded by John Horace Savile
