= William Stanley-Massey-Stanley =

William Thomas Stanley-Massey-Stanley (1807 – 29 June 1863) was a British politician.

Born in Hooton, Cheshire, Stanley stood in the 1837 UK general election in Pontefract for the Whigs. He won the seat, but stood down at the 1841 UK general election. That year, he succeeded his father as 10th baronet.

Parliament of the United Kingdom
Preceded by John Gully; John Savile	Member of Parliament for Pontefract; 1837–1841; With: Richard Monckton Milnes	Succeeded by Richard Monckton Milnes; John Savile
