= Princess Anne of Löwenstein-Wertheim-Freudenberg =

English socialite and aviation patron and enthusiast (1867–1927)

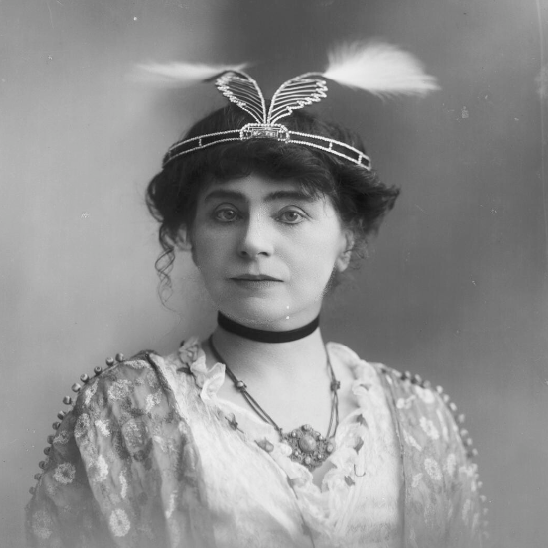
- in 1913 by Bassano
- Born: Lady Anne Savile; 25 May 1864; London, England
- Disappeared: 31 August 1927 (aged 63); North Atlantic Ocean
- Status: Declared dead in absentia, 6 February 1928
- Monuments: Memorial at St Raphael's church, Kingston upon Thames
- Known for: First woman to attempt transatlantic flight and first woman to die in transatlantic flight.
- Spouse: Prince Ludwig of Löwenstein-Wertheim-Freudenberg (m. 1897; died 1899)
- Parents: John Savile, 4th Earl of Mexborough; Agnes Louisa Elizabeth Raphael

Princess Anne of Löwenstein-Wertheim-Freudenberg (German: Anne Prinzessin zu Löwenstein-Wertheim-Freudenberg; née Lady Anne Savile; 25 May 1864 – 31 August 1927) was an English socialite and aviation patron and enthusiast. Anne was the first woman both to attempt and to die in a transatlantic aircraft flight, as well as the second to die in a transoceanic flight. Through her marriage to Prince Ludwig of Löwenstein-Wertheim-Freudenberg, Anne was a Princess of Löwenstein-Wertheim-Freudenberg and a member of the Princely House of Löwenstein-Wertheim-Freudenberg.

== Family ==
Anne was born on 25 May 1864 in London, England, a daughter of John Savile, 4th Earl of Mexborough, and his second wife Agnes Louisa Elizabeth Raphael.

== Marriage ==
Anne married Prince Ludwig of Löwenstein-Wertheim-Freudenberg, eighth child and sixth son of Wilhelm, Prince of Löwenstein-Wertheim-Freudenberg, and his first wife, Countess Olga Klara of Schönburg-Forderglauchau, on 15 May 1897 in London. Anne and Ludwig were distantly related (7th cousins), as both were descendants of Sir Henry Garraway, who served as Lord Mayor of London. Following their marriage, she became a citizen of the German Empire. In addition to her "personal charms," Anne brought a great fortune to the marriage. Anne's husband Ludwig mysteriously disappeared within a year of their marriage in the Philippines during the Spanish–American War, where he was killed during fighting between Emilio Aguinaldo-led insurgents and the United States Army in the Battle of Caloocan of the Philippine–American War. She was notified of her husband Ludwig's death through the United States Embassy in London. Anne regained her British nationality in 1918 following World War I.

== Anti-seasick bed ==
Before the outbreak of World War I, Anne continued to regularly visit the United States. On one such occasion in January 1913, she arrived on the White Star liner SS Majestic to New York City from Southampton. Accompanied by her secretary, Hughes Massie, Anne brought with her an "automatic balancing bed" of her own invention which she had declared prevented sea sickness.

== Aviation enthusiast ==
Anne began flying as a passenger aboard aircraft in 1914. She then befriended Captain Leslie Hamilton, a World War I flying ace nicknamed the "Flying Gypsy". Anne was a passenger when Hamilton flew in the 1923 King's Cup Race. During her participation as a passenger in aviation events, she usually flew under her maiden name, "Lady Anne Savile".

In 1922, Anne rode as a passenger in her own aircraft in a cup race from Croydon to Edinburgh, Scotland. In 1925, she and Hamilton attempted a flight from London to Paris. Following their departure, their aircraft was not seen after it passed Folkestone and a search of the English Channel was begun. After an all-night search, the aircraft was found near Pontoise, a northwest suburb of Paris, where it had been forced down due to engine trouble.

=== Transatlantic flight and disappearance ===
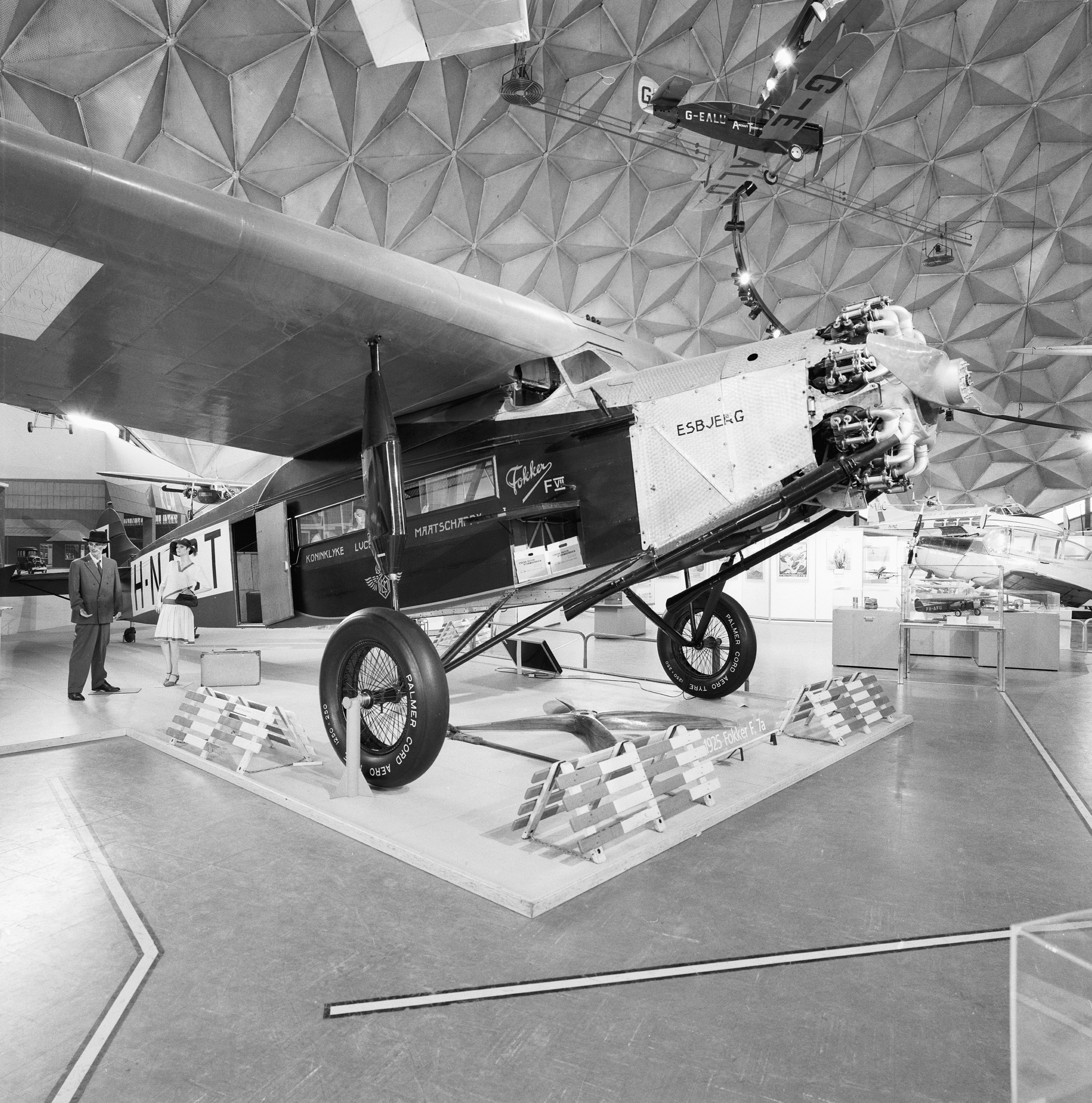
A Fokker VIIa, similar to St. Raphael

In 1927, Anne financed Captain Leslie Hamilton's attempt to set an aviation record by being the first aviator to fly over the Atlantic Ocean from east to west from England to Canada. Against her relatives' protests, including those of her brother John Horace Savile, 5th Earl of Mexborough, she decided to join Hamilton's expedition as a passenger because she had dreamed of becoming the first woman to "fly the sea". Anne, Captain Hamilton, and Colonel Frederick F. Minchin took off from the aerodrome at Upavon, Wiltshire at 7:32 a.m. on 31 August 1927 in a large Fokker F.VII monoplane powered by a 450 hp Bristol Jupiter engine known as the Saint Raphael bound for Ottawa. For the historic flight, Anne was dressed in royal purple to demonstrate what style of clothing she felt women should wear during a transatlantic flight. Her wardrobe consisted of purple leather knee-breeches, a matching jacket, a black crush hat, black silk stockings, and high-heeled fur-lined boots. Anne's flying suit was similar to those she had worn in previous cup races. The Archbishop of Cardiff blessed the aircraft and its occupants, and following the blessing, Anne discarded her coat and boarded the aircraft.

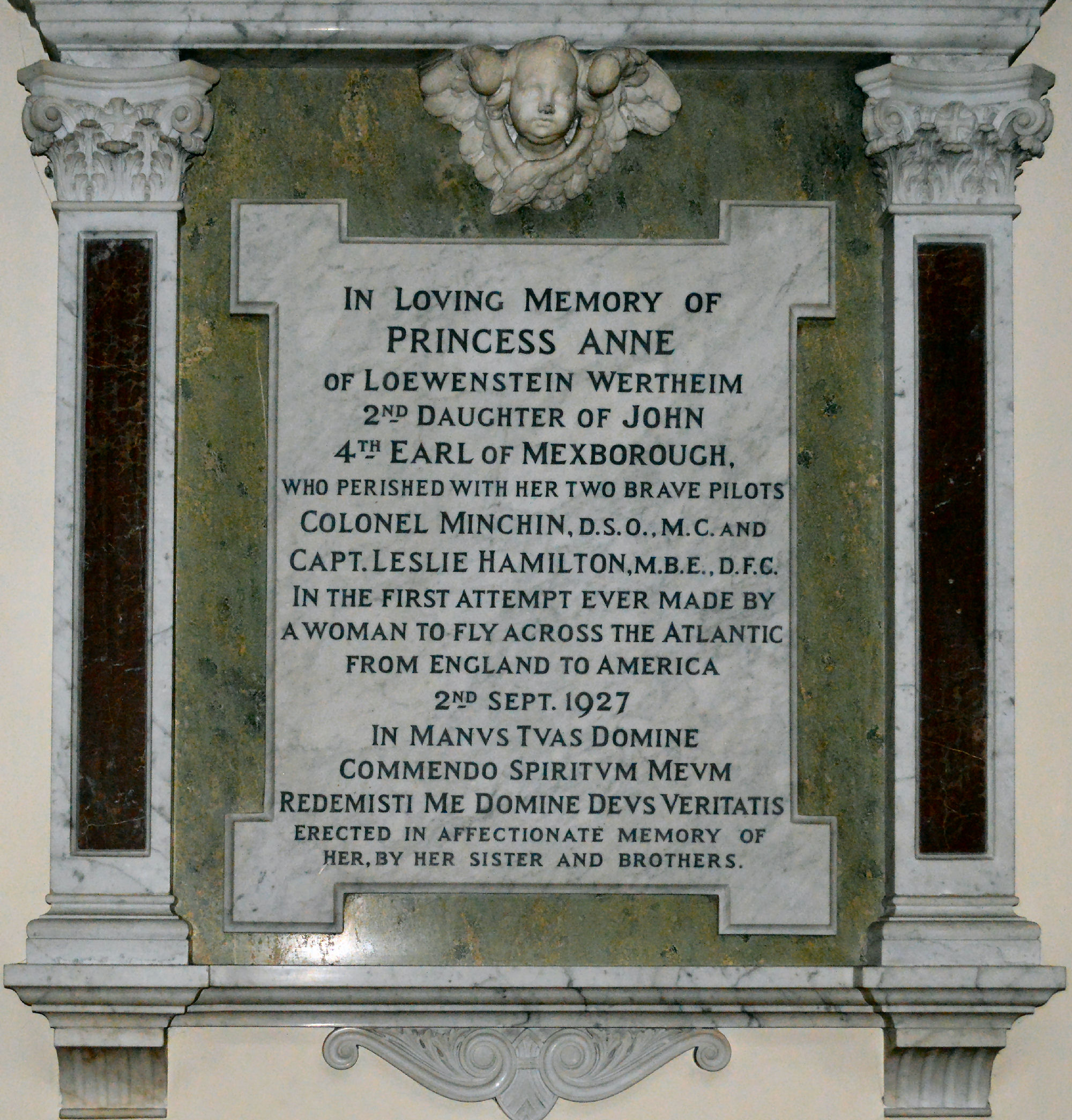
Monument to Princess Anne of Loewenstein Wertheim in St Raphael's Church, Surbiton

The Saint Raphael headed west from the coast of Ireland and was last seen by the crew of the SS Josiah Macy. Around 6 a.m. the next morning the Dutch steamer SS Blijdendijik reported seeing a white light travelling eastward in the sky when about 420 miles east-south-east of New York, which, if it were St. Raphael, was far to the south of its intended route, suggesting that they were lost. The aircraft was never seen again. Wireless communications with all points along the coast of Labrador failed to find any trace of the Saint Raphael following its disappearance in flight. Further searches failed to yield signs of the aircraft and its crew, and by 5 September, the remaining hope was that fish-carrying steamers or whalers had rescued Anne, Hamilton, and Minchin after the Saint Raphael plunged into the ocean, as it was supposed. On 5 September, Anne's brothers, the Earl of Mexborough and the Honourable George Savile, announced that they believed their sister had died at sea along with Captain Hamilton and Colonel Minchin. Despite no signs of the Saint Raphael or its crew, it is presumed that Anne, Hamilton, and Minchin perished on 31 August 1927 in the North Atlantic Ocean near Labrador and Newfoundland. Savile family friend Princess Blücher von Wahlstatt told the United Press that "[Anne's] brothers did their best to dissuade her from the unnecessary adventure, but she was bent on going and refused to be dissuaded".

At the time of her death, Anne was the second woman to disappear in an attempted transoceanic flight in nearly two weeks; the first was Mildred Doran, who had been participating in the Dole Air Race from Oakland, California, to Hawaii.

In 1928, the Ontario Surveyor General named a number of lakes in the northwest of the province to honour aviators who had perished during 1927, mainly in attempting oceanic flights. The main lake so named is St Raphael Lake (50.64°N 91.08°W) named for the Saint Raphael; similarly named lakes in the same general vicinity include Hamilton Lake (50.89°N 90.38°W), Minchin Lake (50.78°N 90.53°W) and Wertheim Lake (50.66°N 90.62°W), which commemorates Anne.

Anne was presumed dead by a court order made in London on 6 February 1928; she died intestate and left an estate valued at £28,265 (gross) and net personal property of £20,371.

A large memorial plaque commemorating the fateful flight and dedicated to Anne, Captain Hamilton and Colonel Minchin hangs in St Raphael's church, Kingston upon Thames.

== Ancestry ==
Ancestors of Princess Anne of Löwenstein-Wertheim-Freudenberg

8. John Savile, 2nd Earl of Mexborough
4. John Savile, 3rd Earl of Mexborough
9. Elizabeth Stephenson
2. John Savile, 4th Earl of Mexborough
10. Philip Yorke, 3rd Earl of Hardwicke
5. Lady Anne Yorke
11. Lady Elizabeth Lindsay
1. Lady Anne Savile
6. John Raphael
3. Agnes Louisa Elizabeth Raphael
