= Schönburg family =

European noble family

Princely coat of arms of the House of Schönburg

The House of Schönburg (also Schumburg; Czech: ze Šumburka) is an old noble family of princely and historically sovereign rank. It previously owned large properties in present-day Saxony, Thuringia and Bohemia. As a formerly ruling and mediatized family, it belongs to the Hochadel (German for 'high nobility'). The family today includes two princely branches and a comital branch.

== History ==
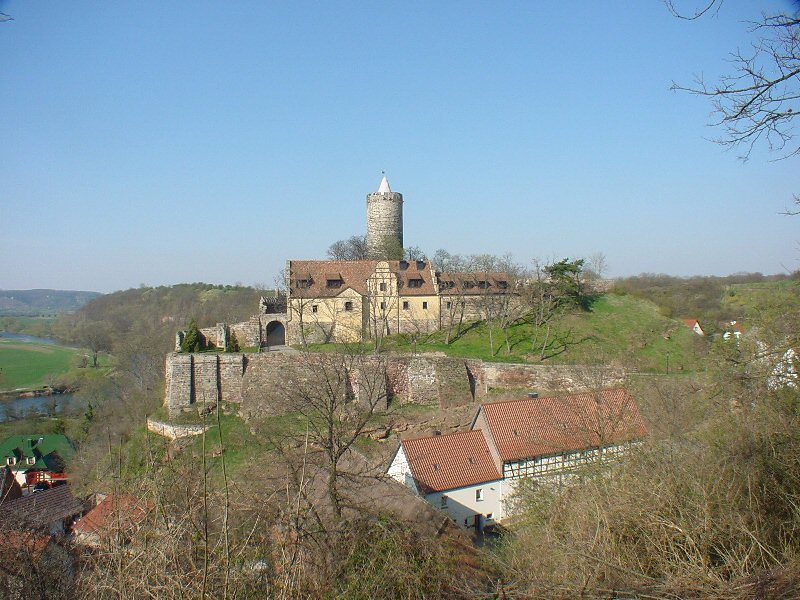
Schönburg Castle

For hundreds of years, the lords of Schönburg have appeared in the history of southwestern Saxony, beginning in 1130, with the mention of Ulricus de Schunenberg (also Sconenberg).

=== Expansion of the house ===
The lords of Schönburg acquired several possessions over the centuries. Glauchau, where they had built a castle as an imperial fief around 1170, came into their ownership in 1256. They owned Lichtenstein since 1286, Waldenburg since 1378, the county of Hartenstein since 1406 and the lordships of Penig and Wechselburg since 1543. They received the lordship of Rochsburg Castle in 1548 in trade for Lohmen, Wehlen, Hohnstein and Kriebstein.

=== Jurisdiction and privileges ===
The territory of Schönburg overlapped into Saxony, Bohemia and eventually Thuringia, and all of it fell under the legal jurisdiction of the Holy Roman Empire of the German Nation. Consequently, the lords of Schönburg had different status in different areas under their possession, depending on whether there was over-lordship, and to whom. They were counted among the noble estates of the Holy Roman Empire, and to the landed estates in the Kingdom of Saxony.

For their estates in the Kingdom of Bohemia, the counts of Schönburg were members of the Imperial College. On 7 August 1700, the collective house was raised to the status of Reichsgrafstand, or imperial county: its branches were consequently raised in status one and all. With this, members of the house received the predicate Illustrious Highness. The honor carried an important implication: the lordship was allodial, not a fief, thus the title, to the property and to the status, was inalienable (it could not be taken away). An allodial territory was a territory for which no feudal contract existed. It was subject to the emperor as sovereign but not to the emperor as overlord. Finally, at his coronation 9 October 1790, Leopold II raised both, the Waldenburg and the Hartenstein branch of the family to the status of a princely house.

=== Mediatization in 1803 and 1806 ===
After the Reichsdeputationshauptschluss in 1803, with many others of the nobility, the members of the house were named as Standesherren, and the family with once sovereign territorial lordship had to forfeit its judicial and legal rights, but retained its social and cultural standing as a sovereign family mediatized to Saxony. In 1818, the House petitioned the German Confederation to recognize the family; in 1828 the Parliament vouchsafed the personal and family rights that had been abrogated in 1806. The House was granted two seats in the Upper House of the Kingdom of Saxony in 1831. In 1878 they lost their last rights of partial sovereignty, however the King of Saxony decreed that all members of the comital branch of the family were to be known as Illustrious Highness, while members of the princely lines were a Serene Highness.

The branches still today existing are the princes of Schönburg-Waldenburg (divided into the side branches Droyßig, Guteborn/Gusow and Gauernitz), the princes of Schönburg-Hartenstein (at Hartenstein, Stein and Lichtenstein) and the counts of Schönburg-Glauchau (formerly owning Glauchau, Penig, Wechselburg and Rochsburg). All family properties were confiscated in 1945 during the communist Land reform in East Germany. After the German reunification, however, Prince Alfred of Schönburg-Hartenstein (b. 1953) bought back Stein Castle and Prince Alexander of Schönburg-Hartenstein acquired Lichtenstein Castle. In 2008, he was elected chairman of the head organization of German nobility associations.

== List of Princes and Counts of Schönburg ==
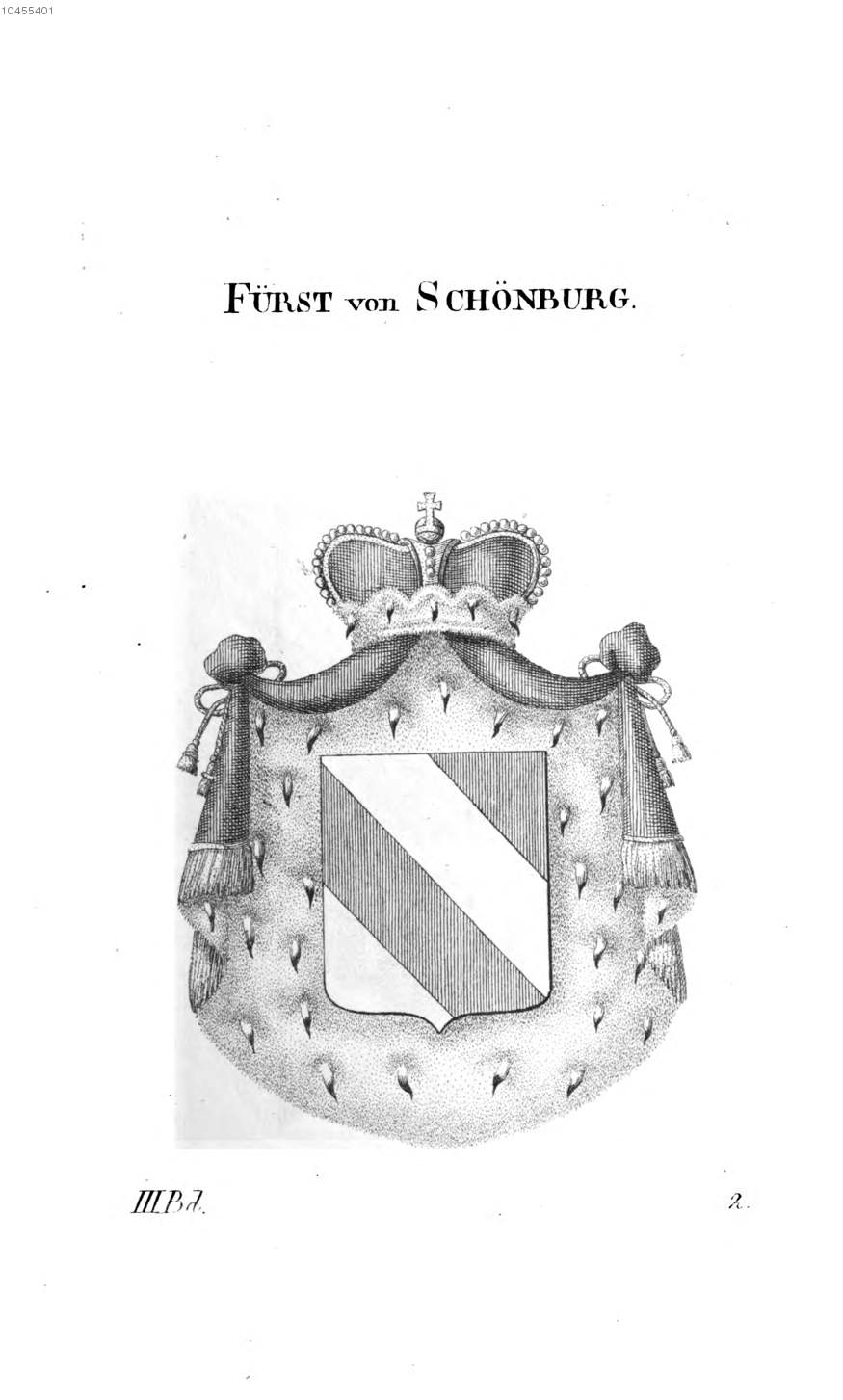
Arms of the Princes of Schönburg

- Otto Karl Friedrich, Prince of Schönburg 1790-1800 (1758-1800), was Count of Schönburg before being created a prince in 1790
  - Princess Jenny of Schönburg-Waldenburg (1780-1809)
  - Otto Victor, 1st Prince of Schönburg-Waldenburg (see below)
  - Friedrich Alfred, 1st Prince of Schönburg-Hartenstein (see below)
  - Heinrich Eduard, 2nd Prince of Schönburg-Hartenstein (see below)

=== Princes of Schönburg-Waldenburg ===
- Otto Victor, 1st Prince 1800-1859 (1785-1859)
  - Otto Friedrich, 2nd Prince 1859-1893 (1819-1893)
    - Victor, Hereditary Prince of Schönburg (1856-1888)
      - Victor, 3rd Prince 1893-1914 (1882-1914)
      - Princess Sophie (1885-1936)
      - Günther, 4th Prince 1914-1960 (1887-1960)
  - Prince Georg (1828-1900)
    - Prince Ulrich Georg (1869-1939)
      - Wolf, 5th Prince 1960-1983 (1902-1983)
        - Princess Anna Luisa (1952)
      - Prince William
        - Ulrich, 6th Prince 1983–present (b.1940)
        - Prince Wolf Christoph (b.1943)
          - Prince Kai-Philipp Wolf (b.1969)
    - Princess Anna Louise (1871-1951)

=== Princes of Schönburg-Hartenstein (1822) ===
- Friedrich Alfred, 1st Prince 1822-1840 (1786-1840)
- Heinrich Eduard, 2nd Prince 1840-1872 (1787-1872)
  - Alexander, 3rd Prince 1872-1896 (1826-1896)
    - Alois, 4th Prince 1896-1944 (1858-1944)
      - Alexander, 5th Prince 1944-1956 (1888-1956)
        - Prince Aloys, Hereditary Prince of Schönburg-Hartenstein (1916-1945)
          - Aloys, 6th Prince 1956-1972 (1945-1972)
        - Hieronymus, 7th Prince 1972-1992 (1920-1992)
        - Alexander, 8th Prince 1992-2018 (1930-2018)
          - Johannes, 9th Prince 2018–present (b. 1951)
            - Hereditary Prince Aloys (b.1982)
              - Prince Alexander (b.2012)
          - Prince Alfred (b.1953)
            - Prince Alexander (b.1979)
            - Prince Ferdinand (b.1984)
        - Prince Constantin (b.1933)
          - Prince Alexander (b.1959)
            - Prince Constantin (b.1983)
            - Prince Mathias (b.1995)
          - Prince Michael (b.1960)
          - Prince Eduard (b.1966)
    - Prince Johannes (1864-1937)
      - Princess Aloysia Louise Alexandra (1906-1976)
      - Prince Aloys (1906-1998)
        - Prince Johannes (b.1938)
        - Prince Nikolaus (b.1940)
          - Prince Johannes (b.1972)
        - Prince Alexander (b.1955)
      - Prince Peter (1915-2003)
        - Princess Alexandra (b.1946)
        - Princess Victoria (b.1955)
        - Prince Peter (b.1953)
          - Prince Hans (b.1987-2020)
          - Prince Benjamin (b.1989)

=== Counts of Schönburg-Glauchau (1700) ===
- Samuel Heinrich, Count of Schönburg-Wechselburg 1700-1706 (d.1706)
  - Franz Heinrich, Count of Schönburg-Wechselburg 1706-1746 (d.1746)
    - Karl Heinrich, Count of Schönburg-Penig/Forderglauchau 1746-1800 (1729–1800)
      - Wilhelm Albrecht Heinrich, Count of Schönburg-Forderglauchau 1800-1815 (1762–1815)
        - Karl Heinrich Alban, Count of Schönburg-Forderglauchau 1815-1864 (1804–1864)
          - Karl, Count of Schönburg-Forderglauchau 1864-1898 (1832–1898)
            - Joachim, Count of Schönburg-Glauchau 1898-1943 (1873–1943)
              - Carl, Count of Schönburg-Glauchau 1943-1945 (1899–1945)
                - Joachim, Count of Schönburg-Glauchau 1945-1998 (1929–1998)
                  - Maya, Countess von Schönburg-Glauchau (1958-2019)
                  - Gloria, Princess of Thurn and Taxis (b.1960)
                  - Carl Alban (b.1966) - renounced his succession rights in 1995
                    - Hubertus von Schönburg-Glauchau (b.1996)
                    - Benedict von Schönburg-Glauchau (b.1999)
                  - Alexander, Count of Schönburg-Glauchau 1998–present (b.1966)
                    - Maximus, Hereditary Count of Schönburg-Glauchau (b.2003)
                    - Count Valentin (b.2005)
                  - Anabel Maya Felicitas (b. 1980)
                - Count Rudolf (b.1932)
                  - Friedrich (b.1985)
                - Count Johannes (b.1938)
                - Count Carl Georg (1940-2024)
                  - Friedrich-Christian (b.1971)
                    - Constantin (b.2001)
                    - Ludwig (b.2003)
                    - Count Philipp (b.2006)
                  - Johannes-Joachim (b.1976)
                    - Carl Georg (b.2008)
                    - Albert (b.2010)

== Former properties of the Princes of Schönburg-Waldenburg ==
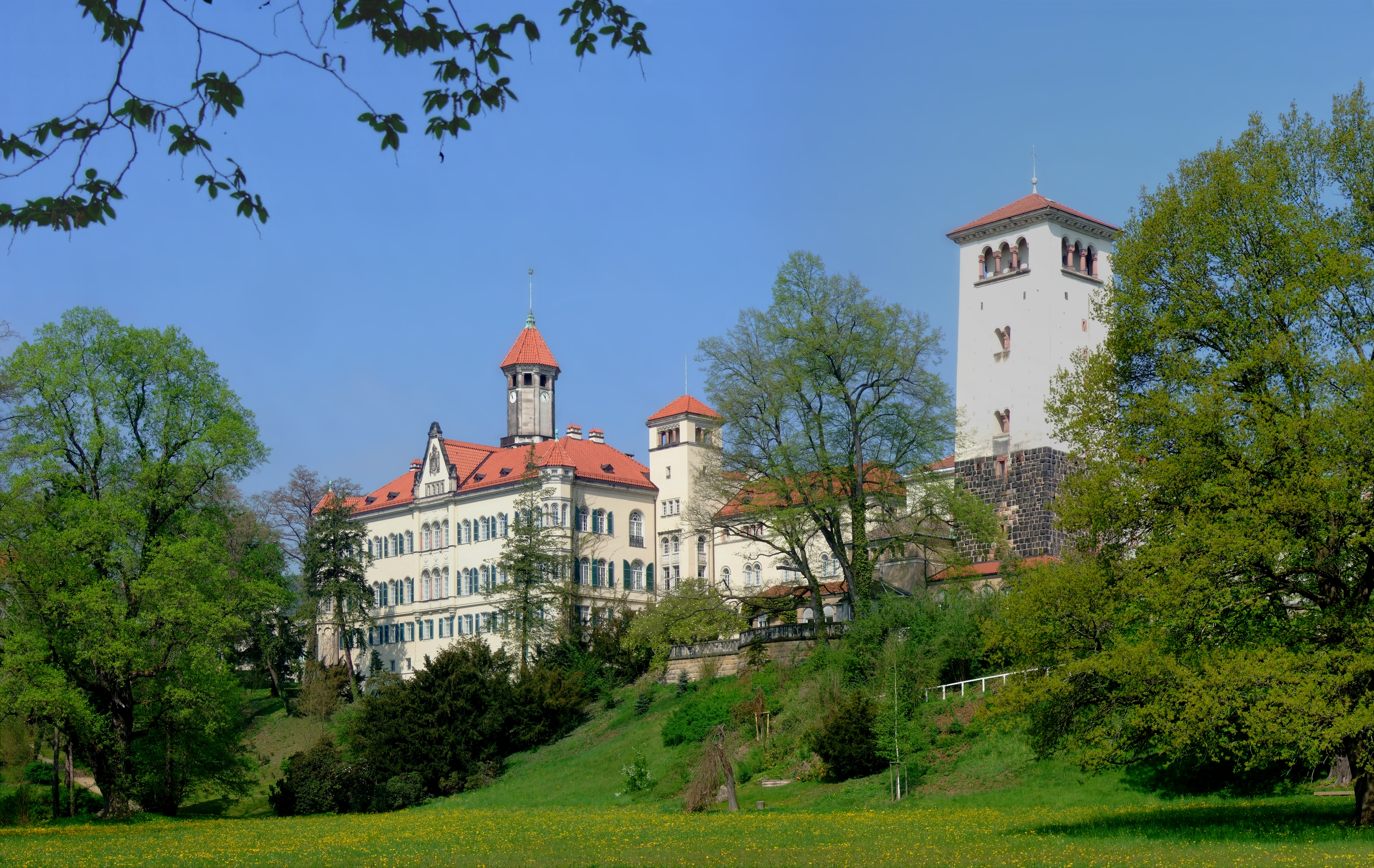
Waldenburg Castle

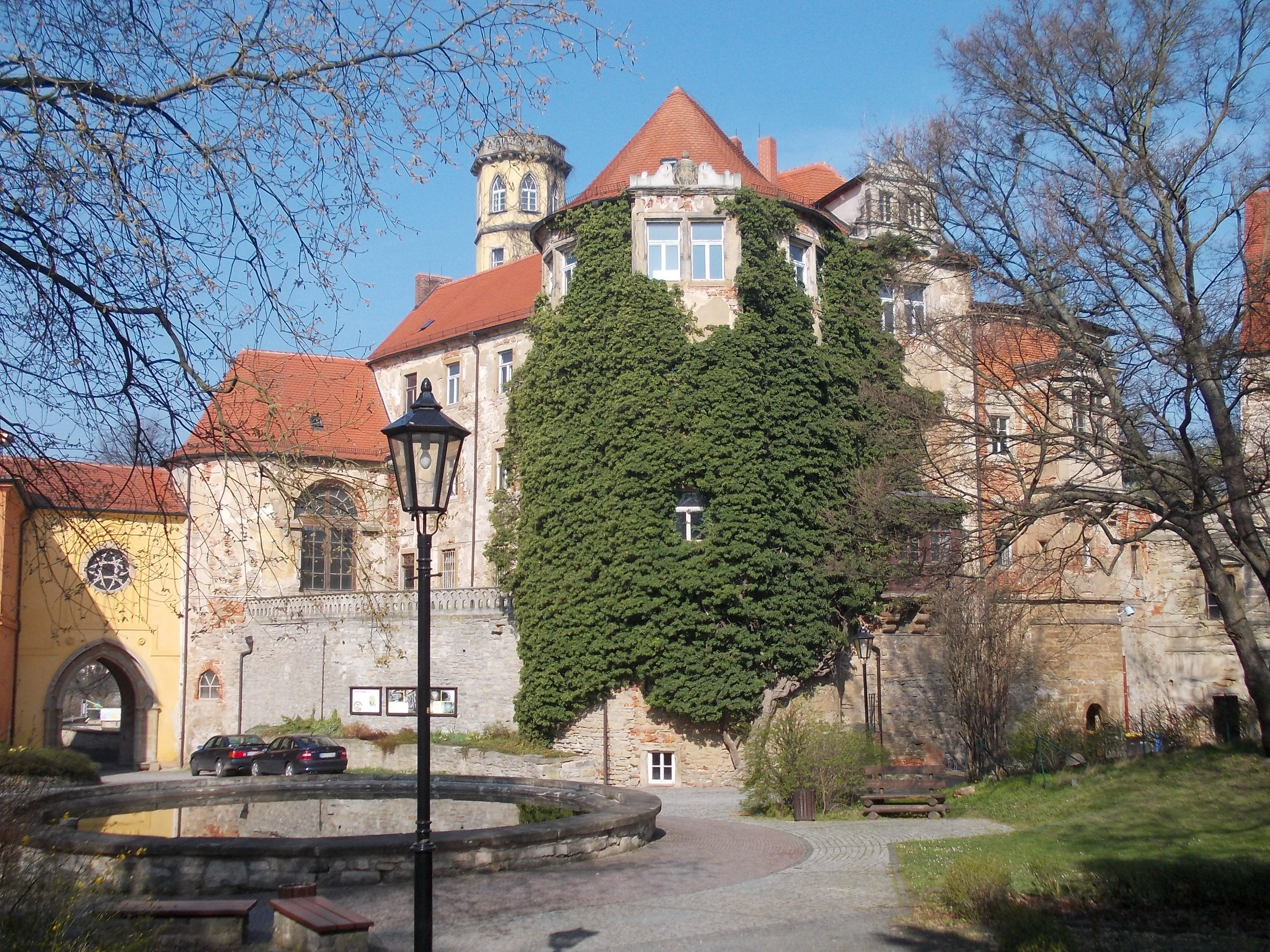
Droyßig Castle

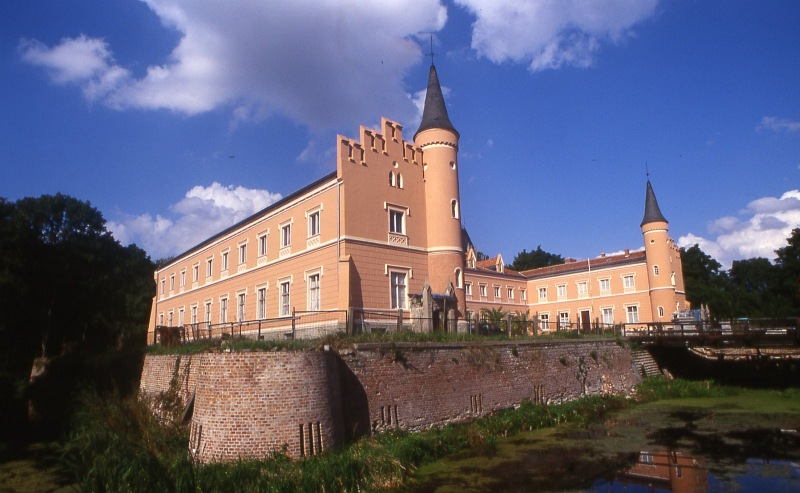
Gusow Castle

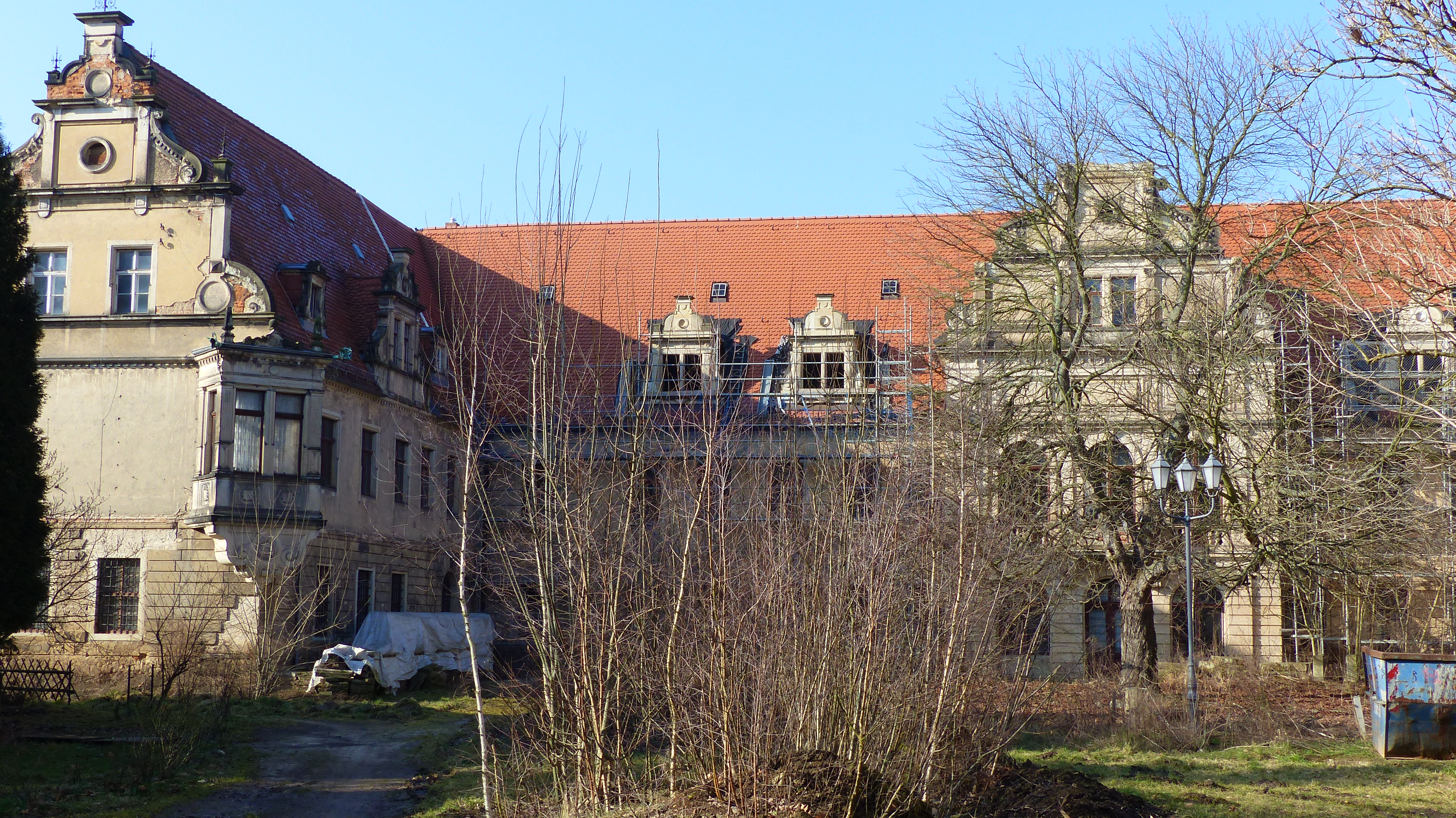
Gauernitz Castle at Klipphausen

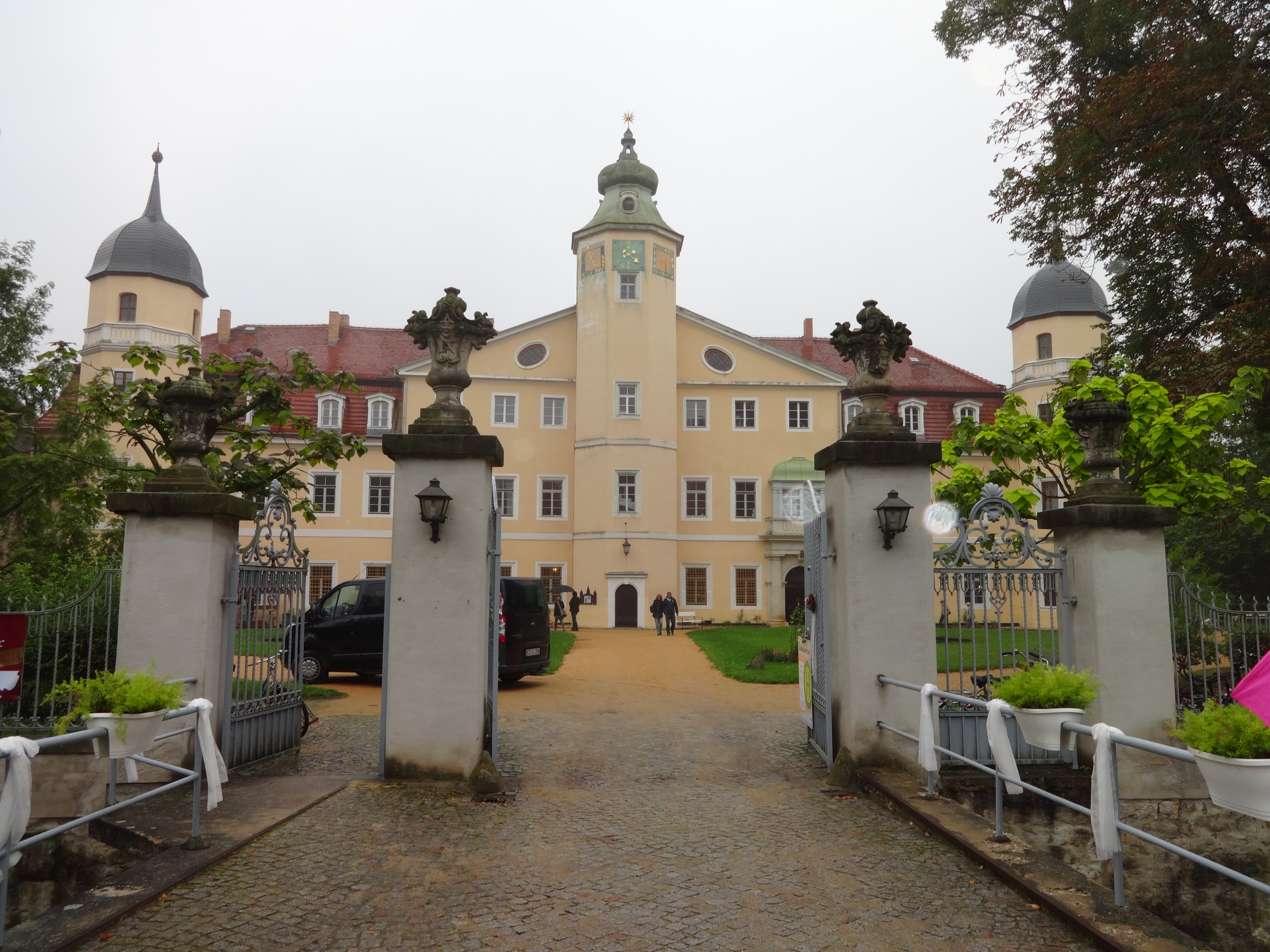
Hermsdorf Castle at Ottendorf-Okrilla

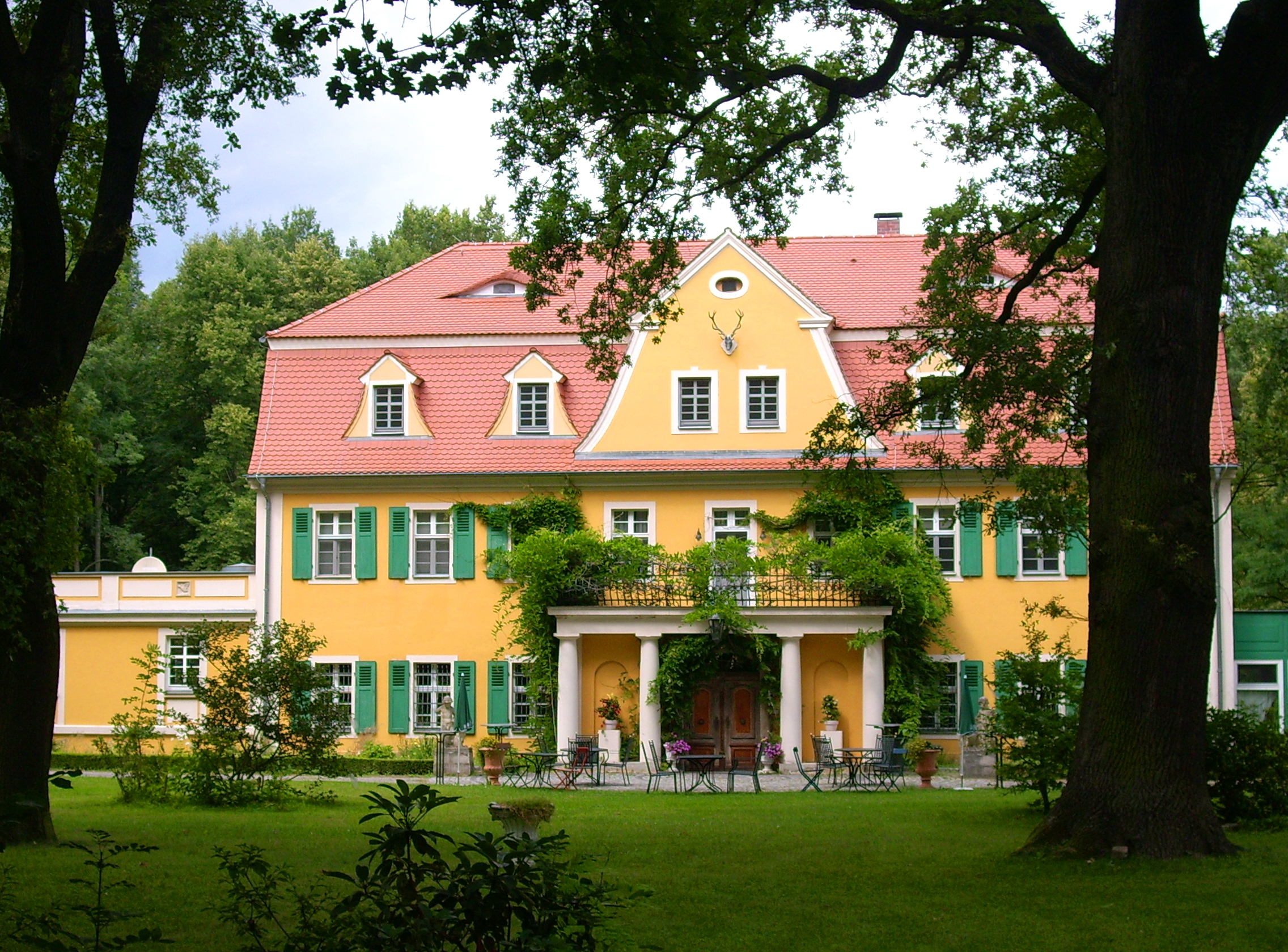
Castle Weißig Lohsa

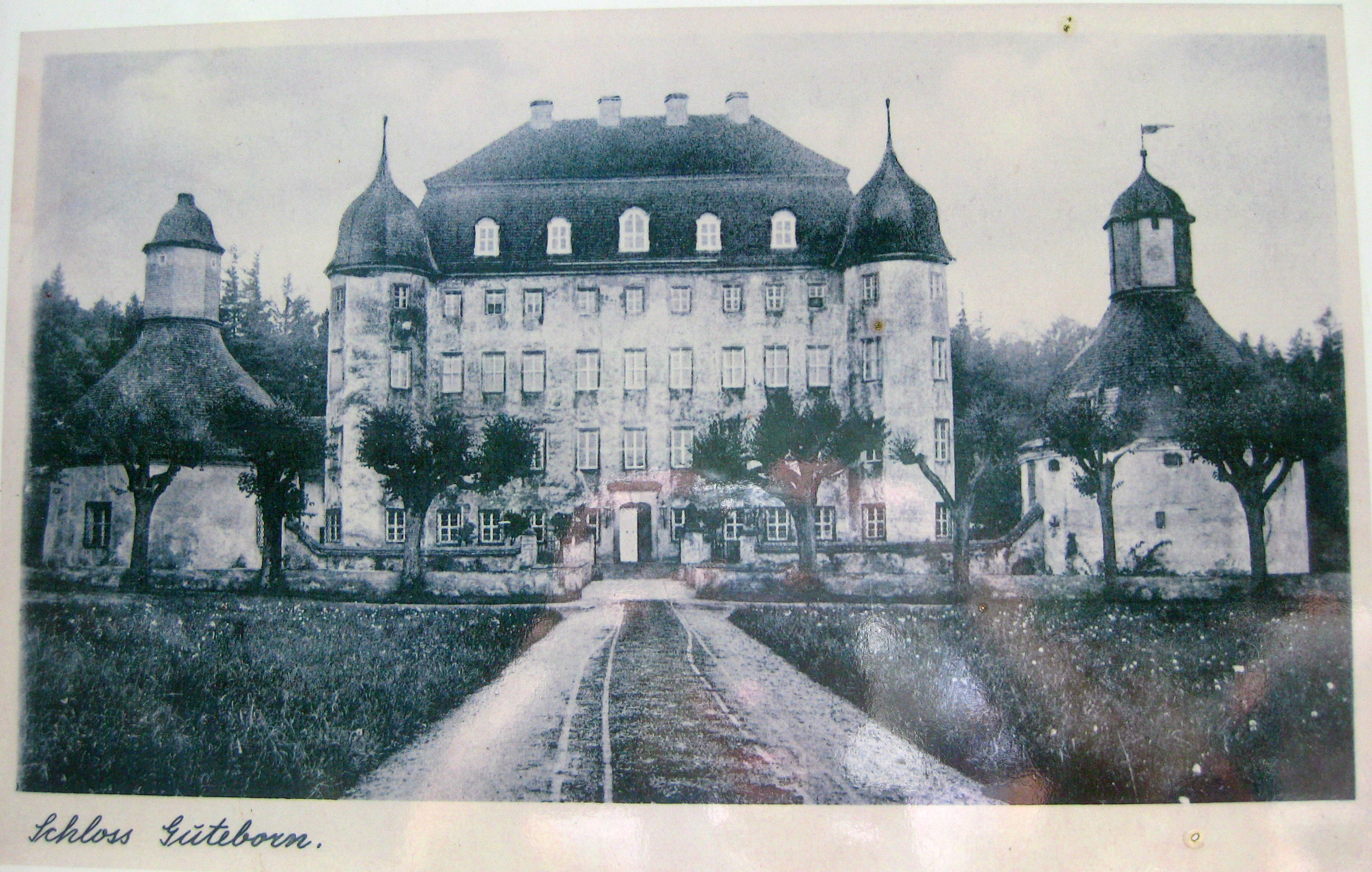
Guteborn Castle

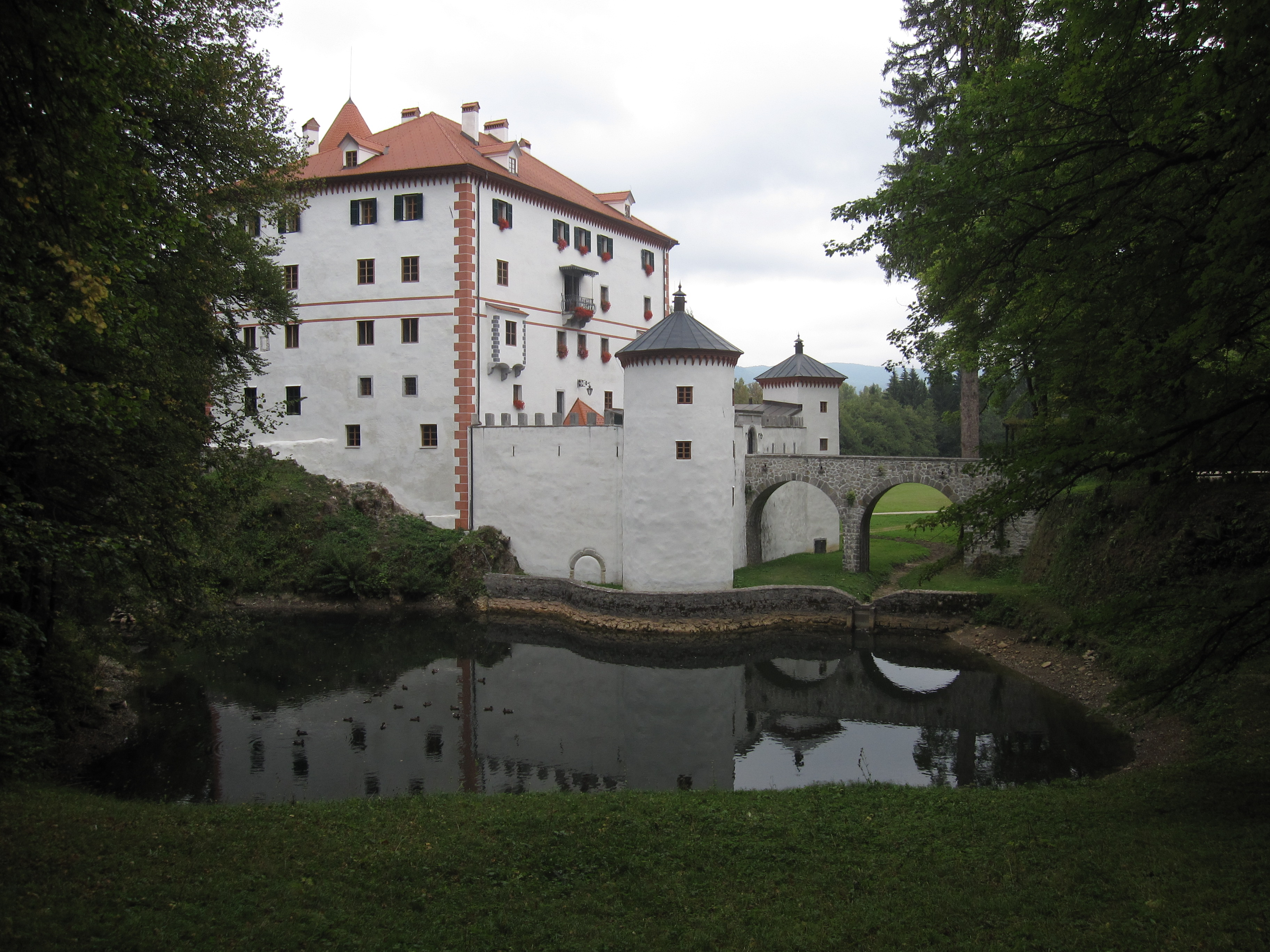
Snežnik Castle, Slovenia

== Properties of the Princes of Schönburg-Hartenstein ==
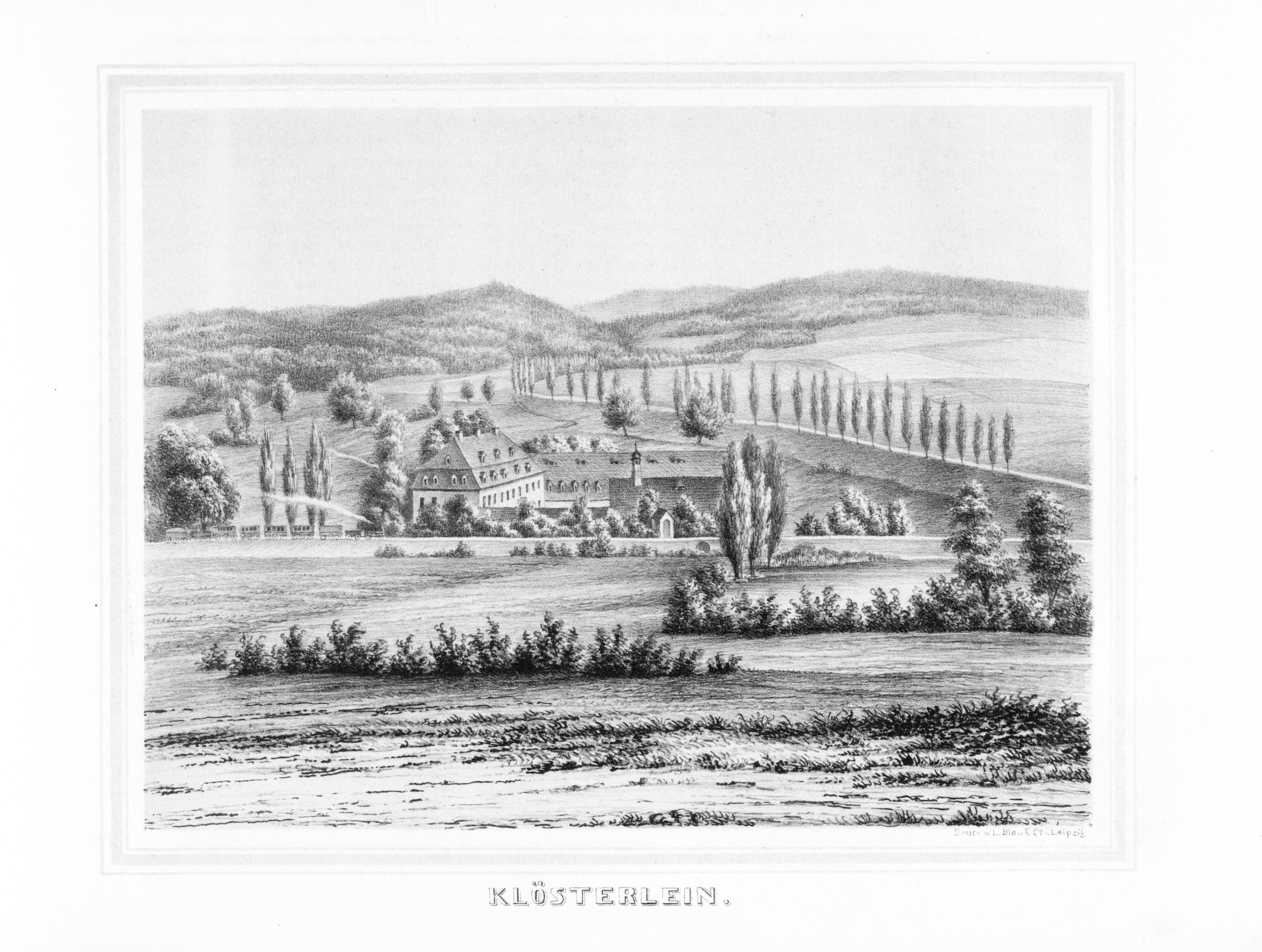
Rittergut Klösterlein, Saxony

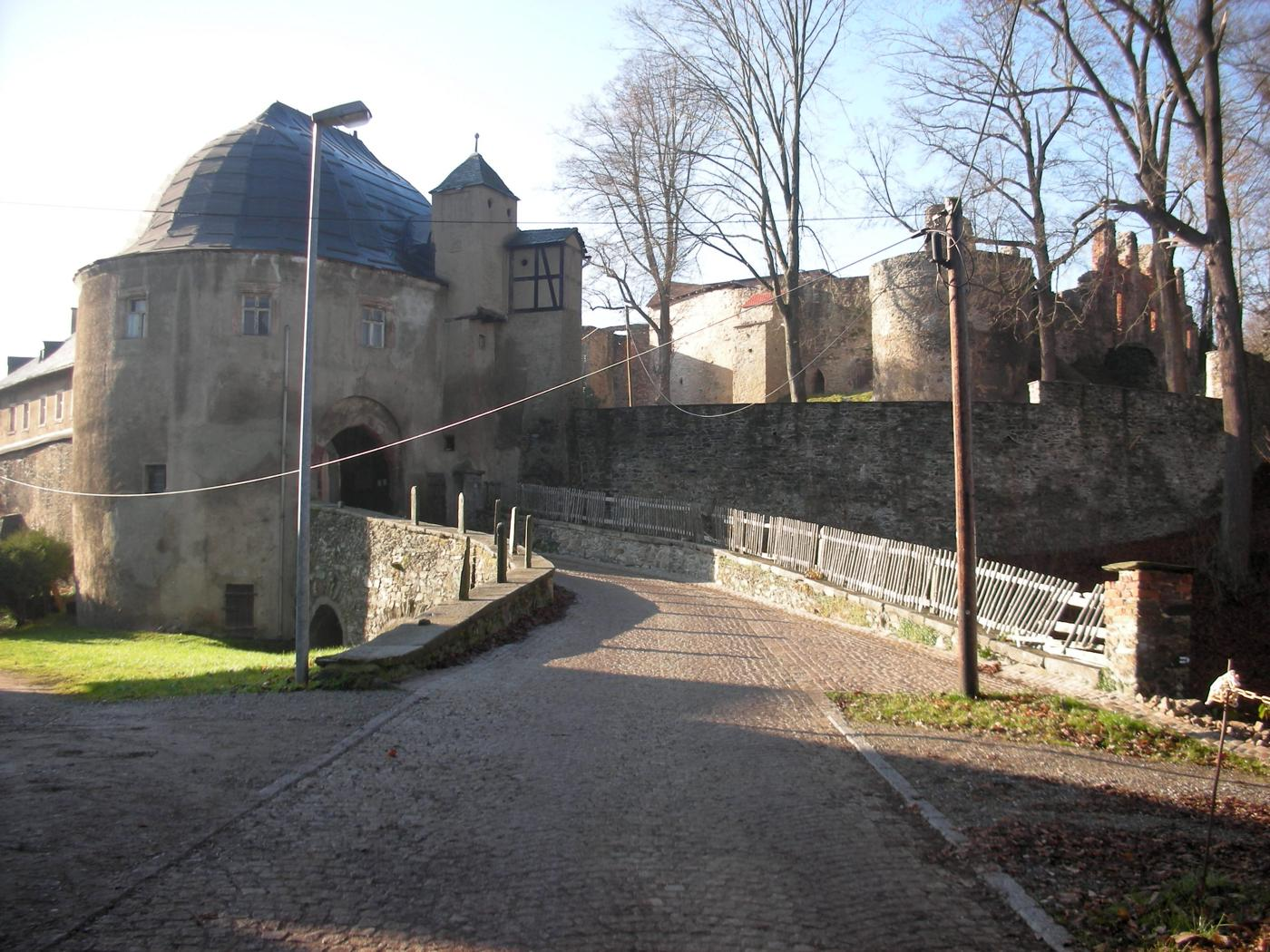
Hartenstein Castle

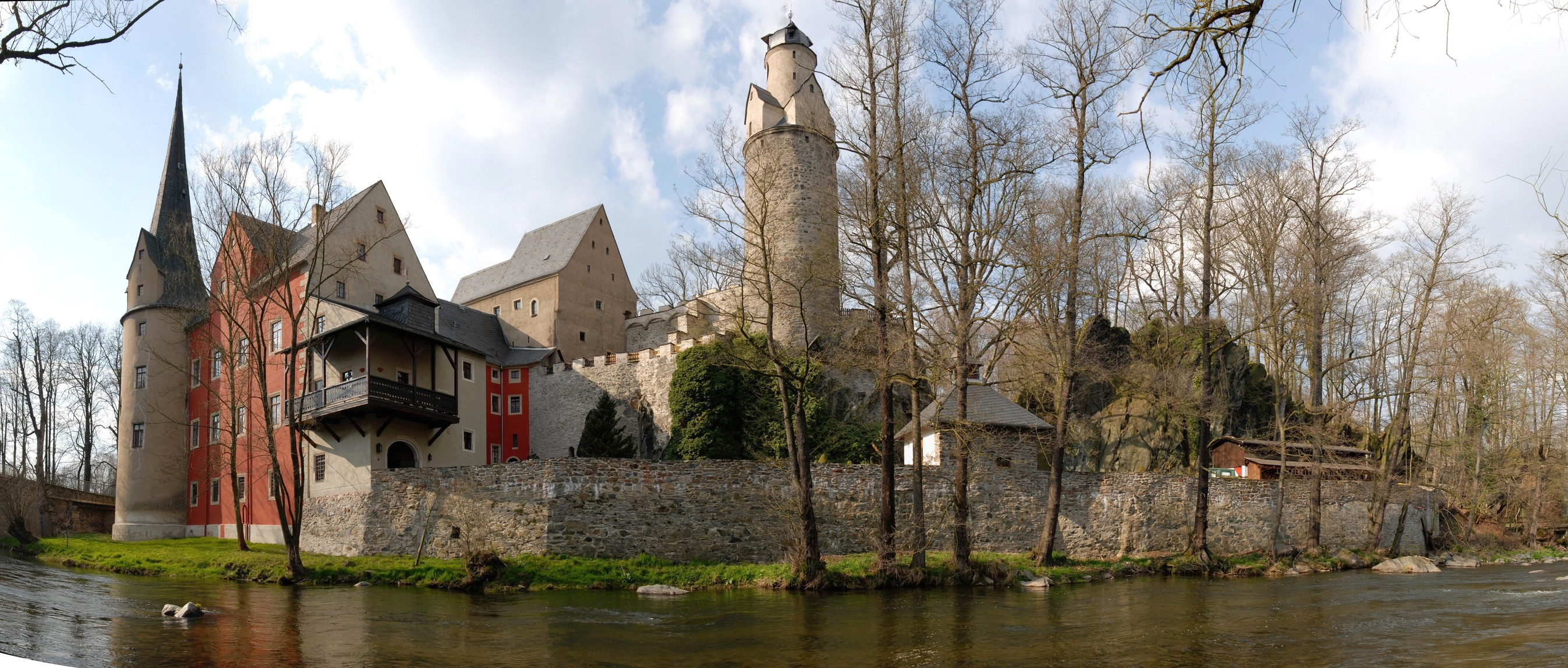
Stein Castle in Hartenstein

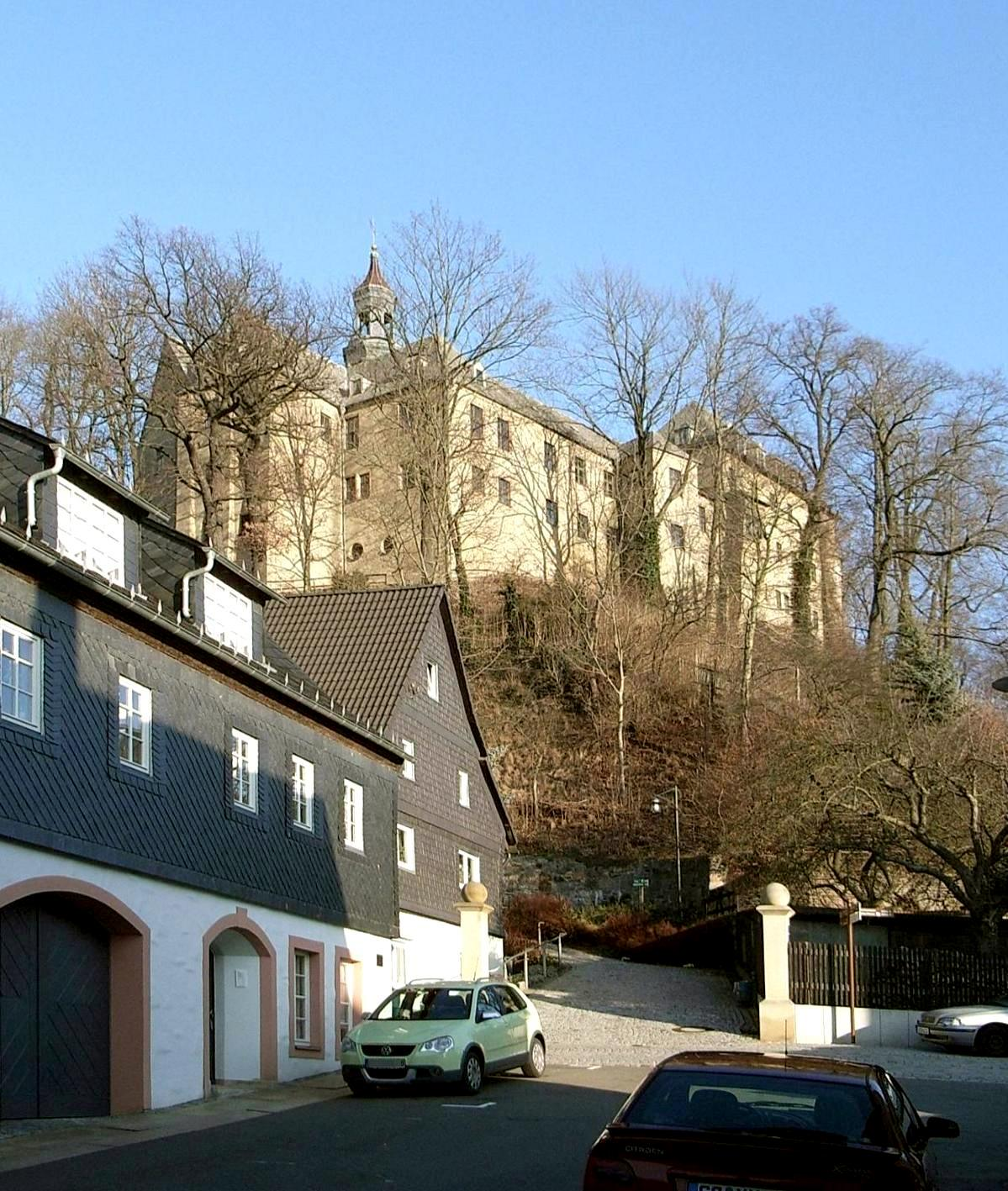
Lichtenstein Castle

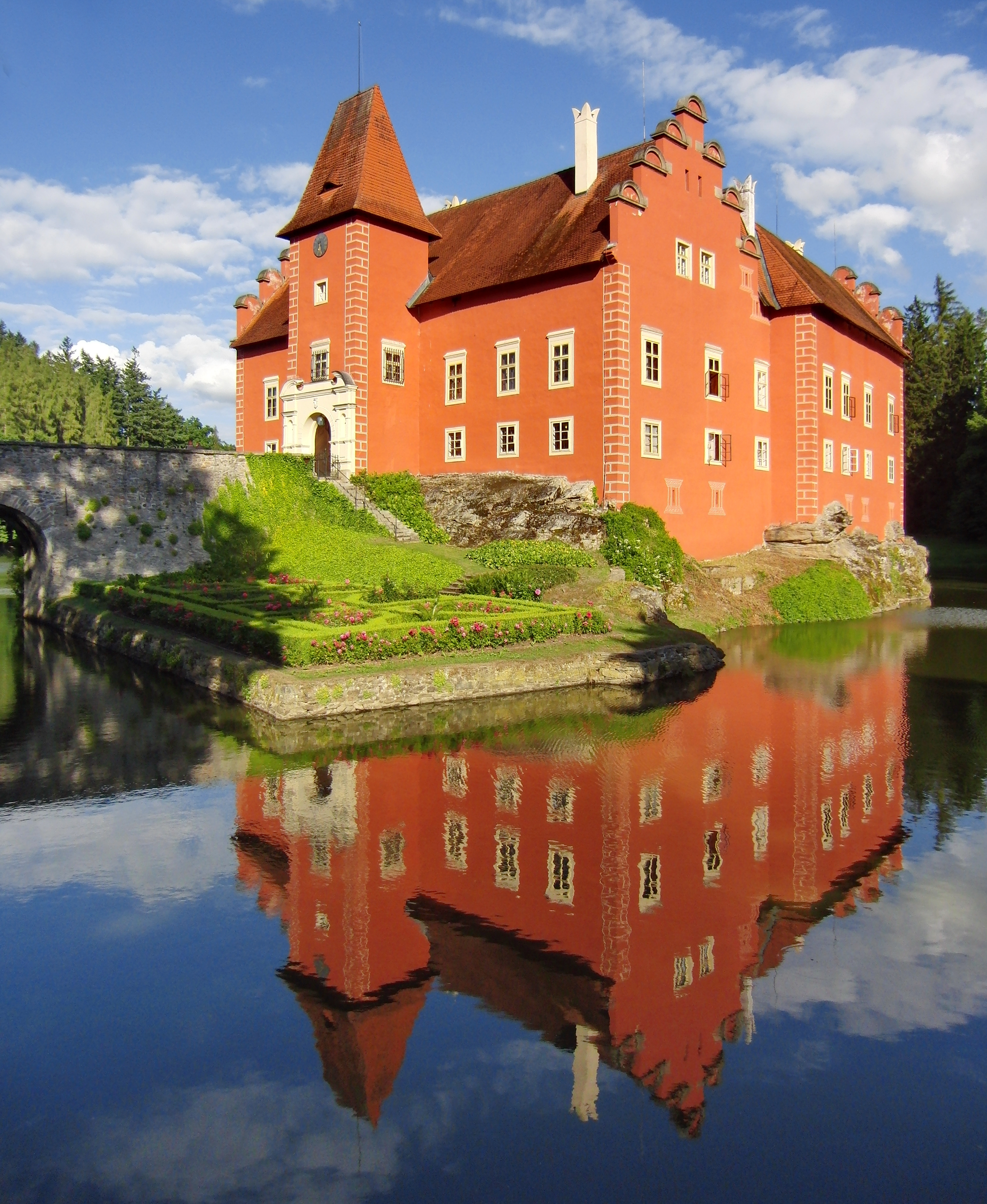
Červená Lhota Castle

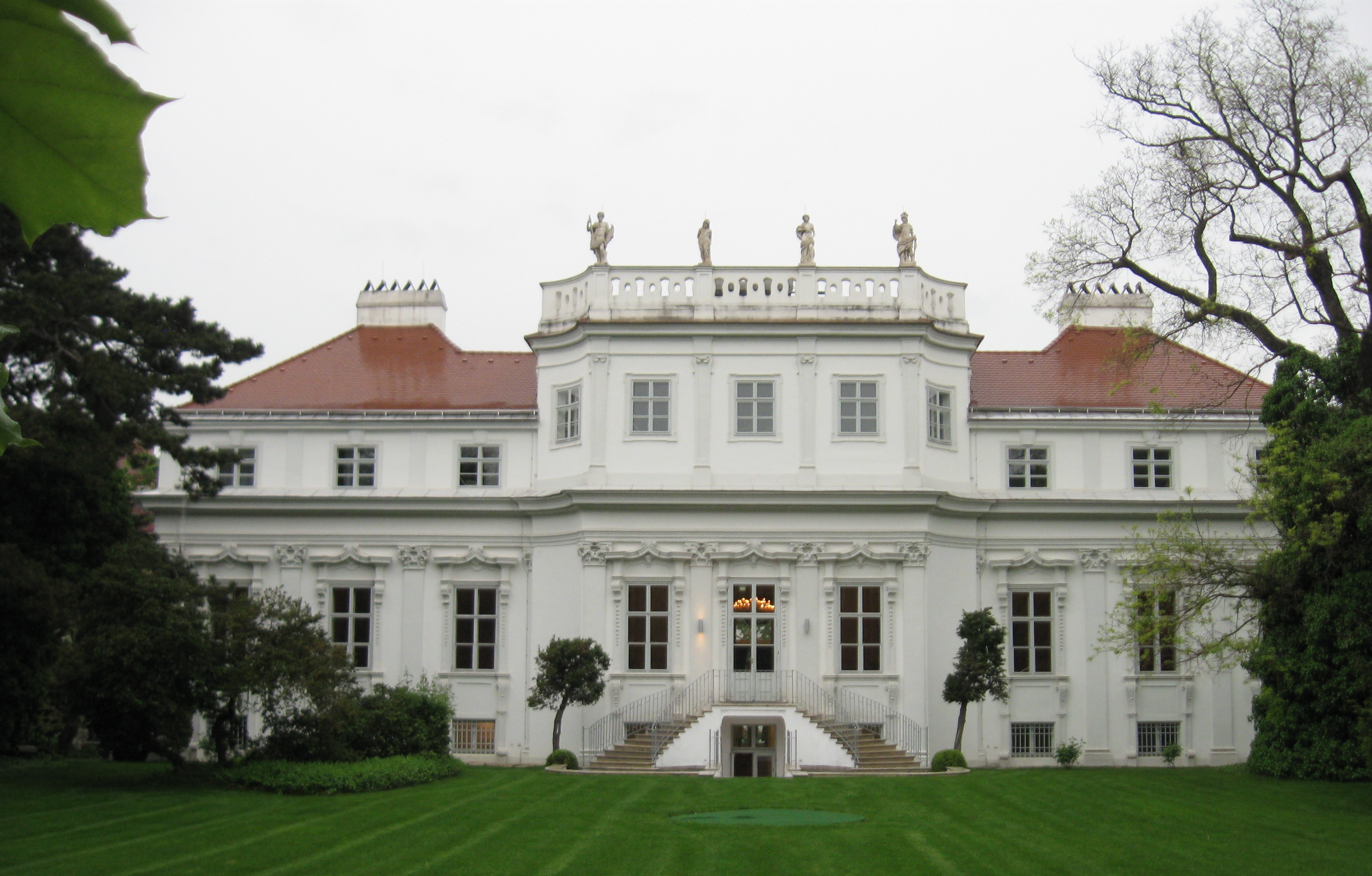
Palais Schönburg, Vienna

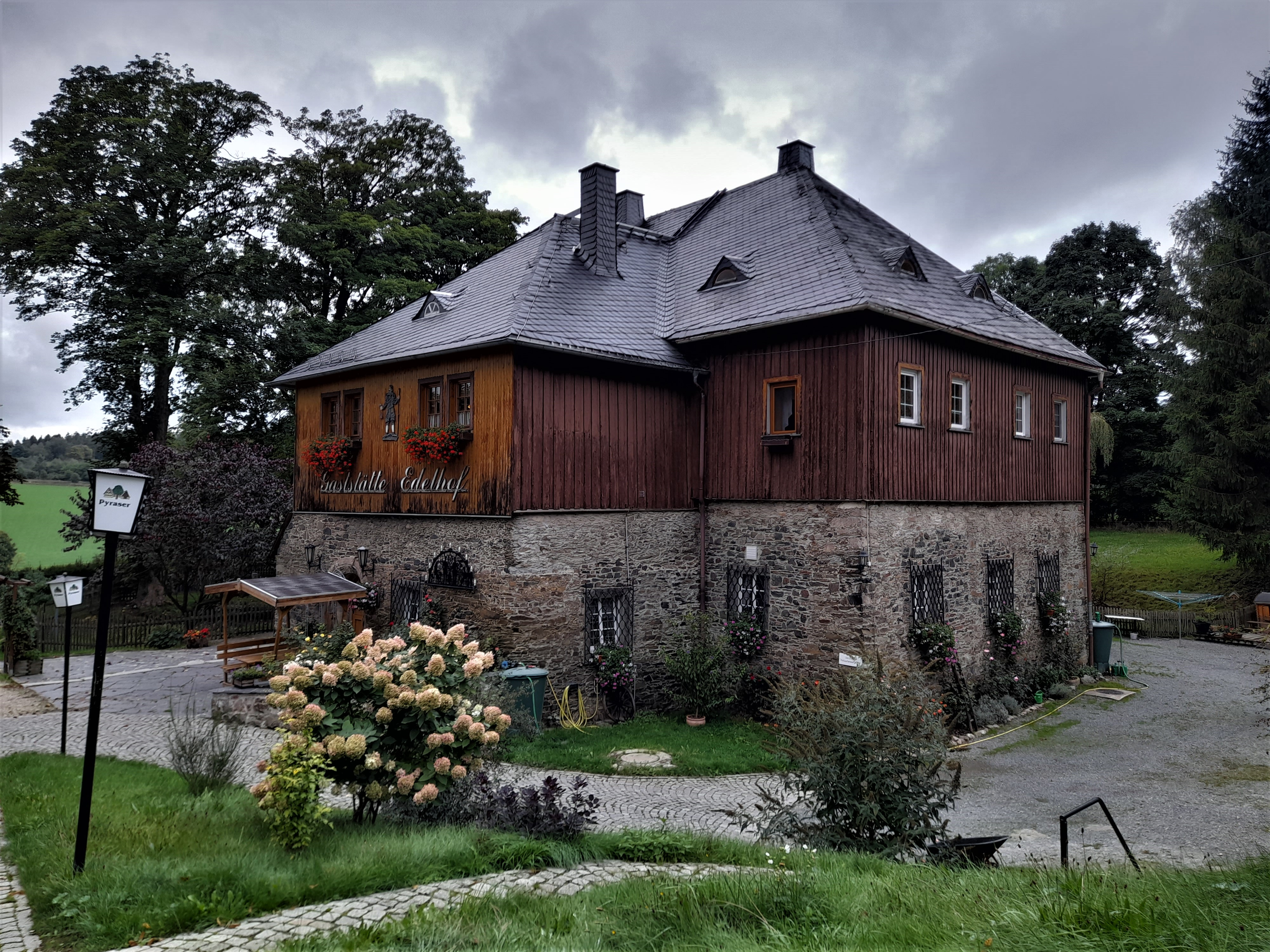
Edelhof Alberoda, Saxony

== Properties of the Counts of Schönburg-Glauchau ==
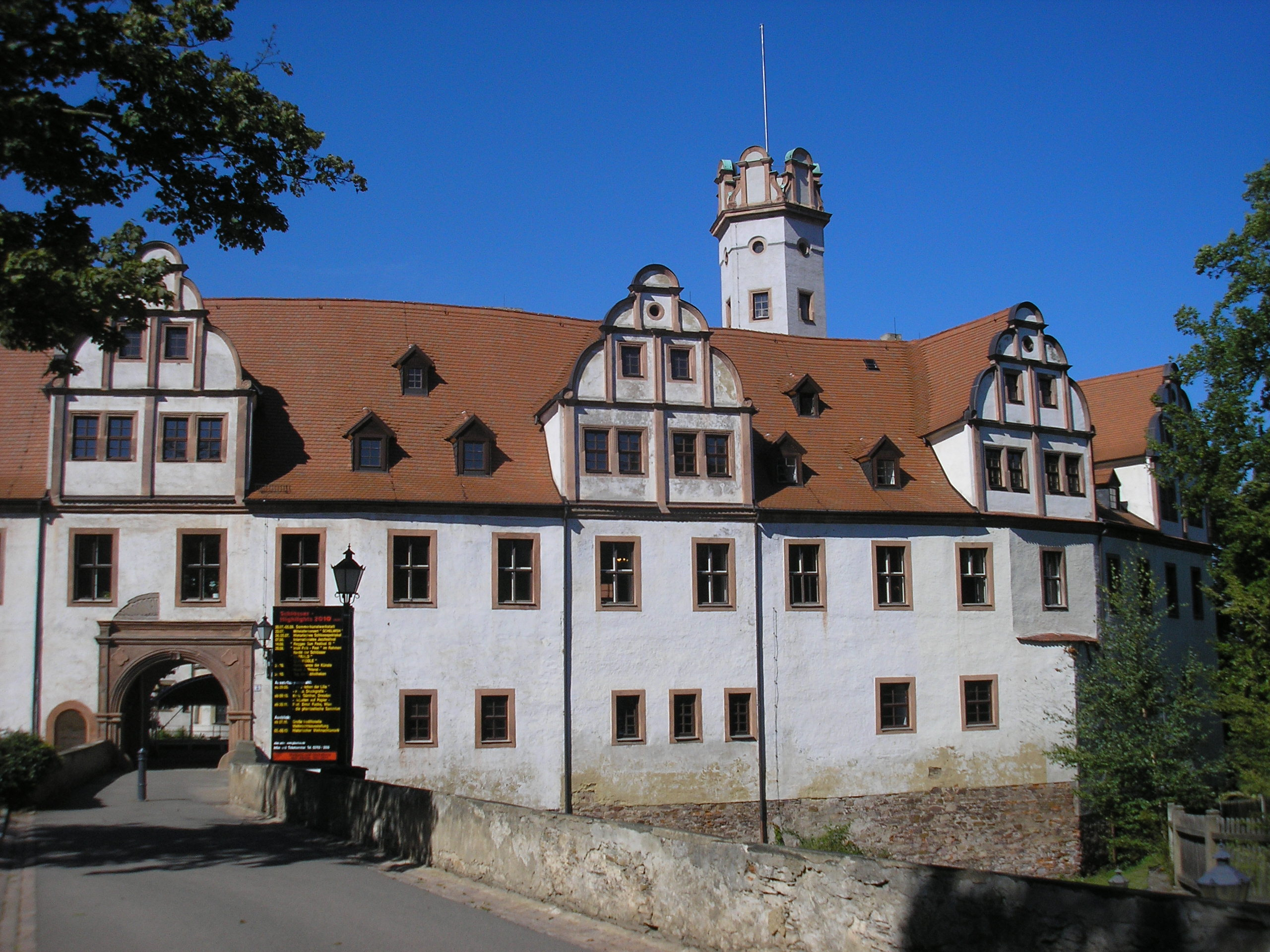
Forderglauchau Castle, Glauchau

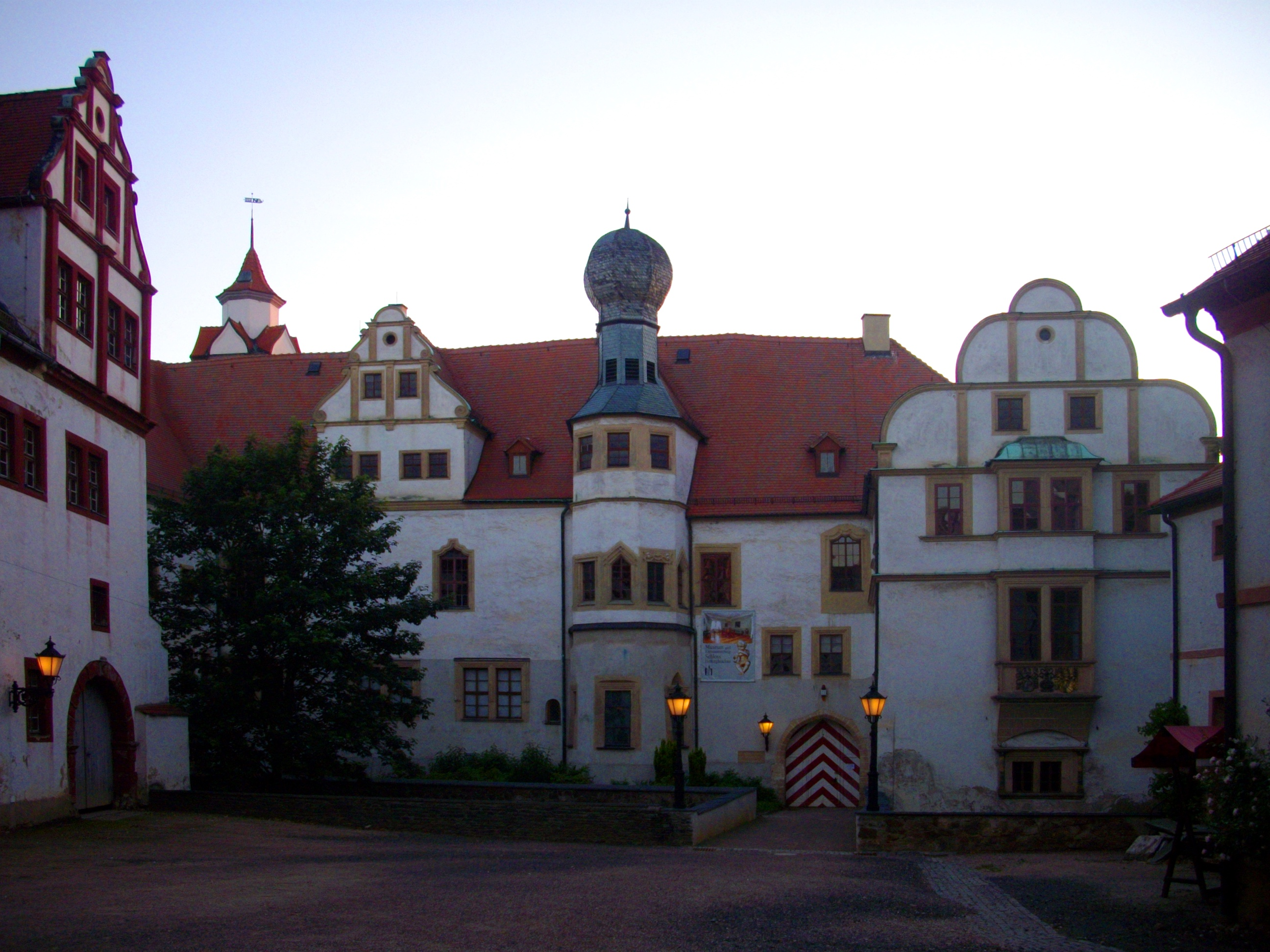
Hinterglauchau Castle Glauchau

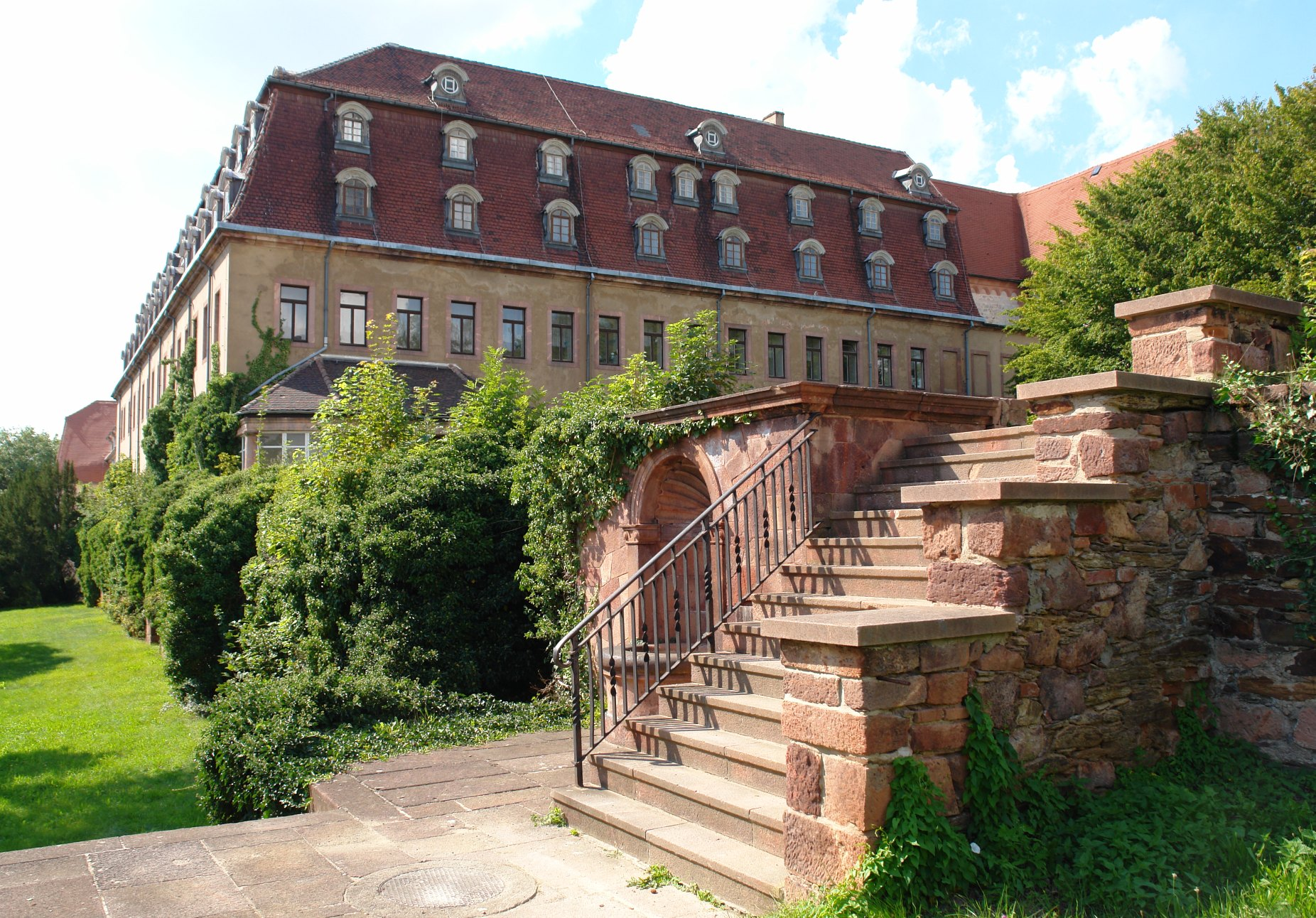
Wechselburg Castle

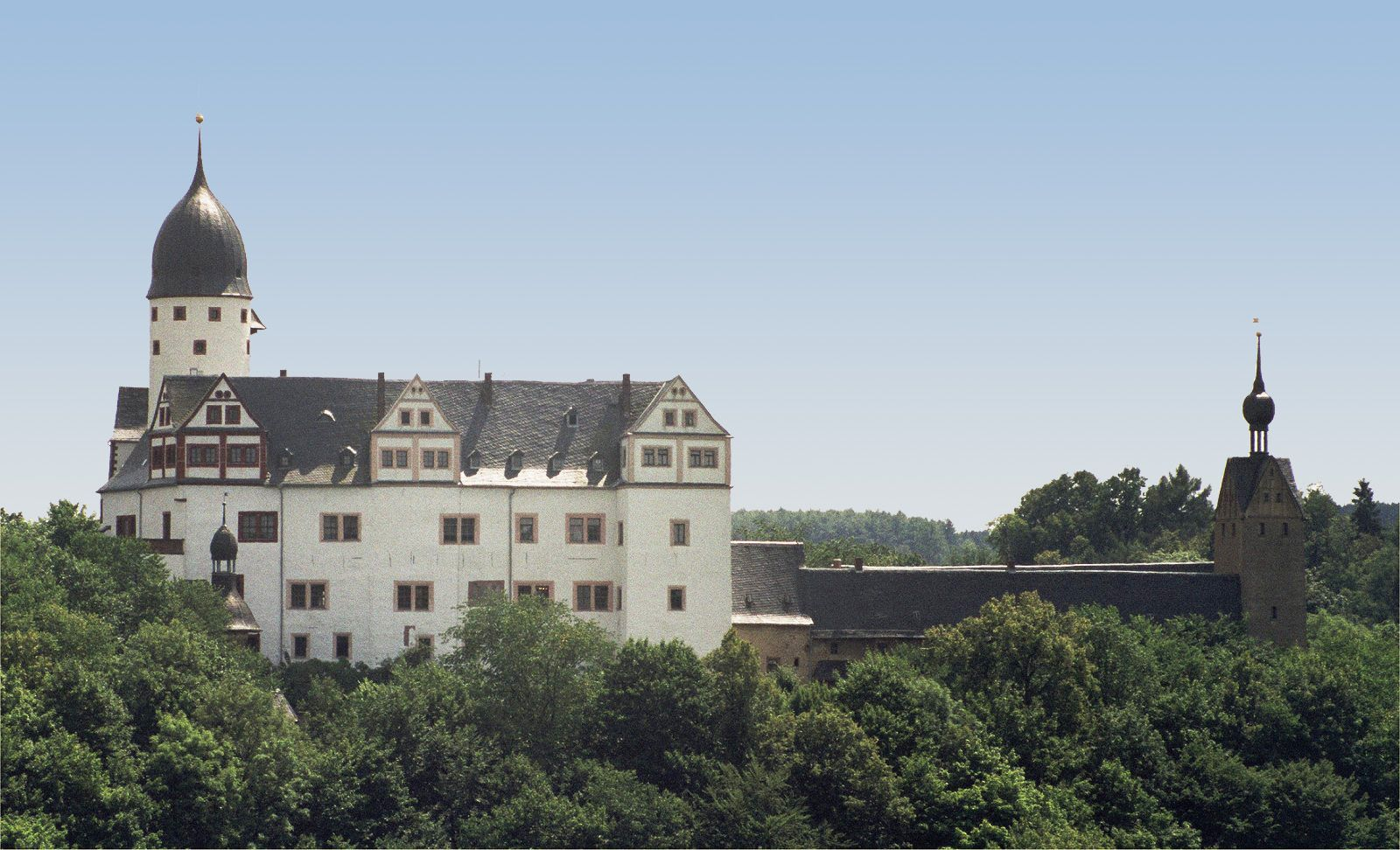
Rochsburg Castle

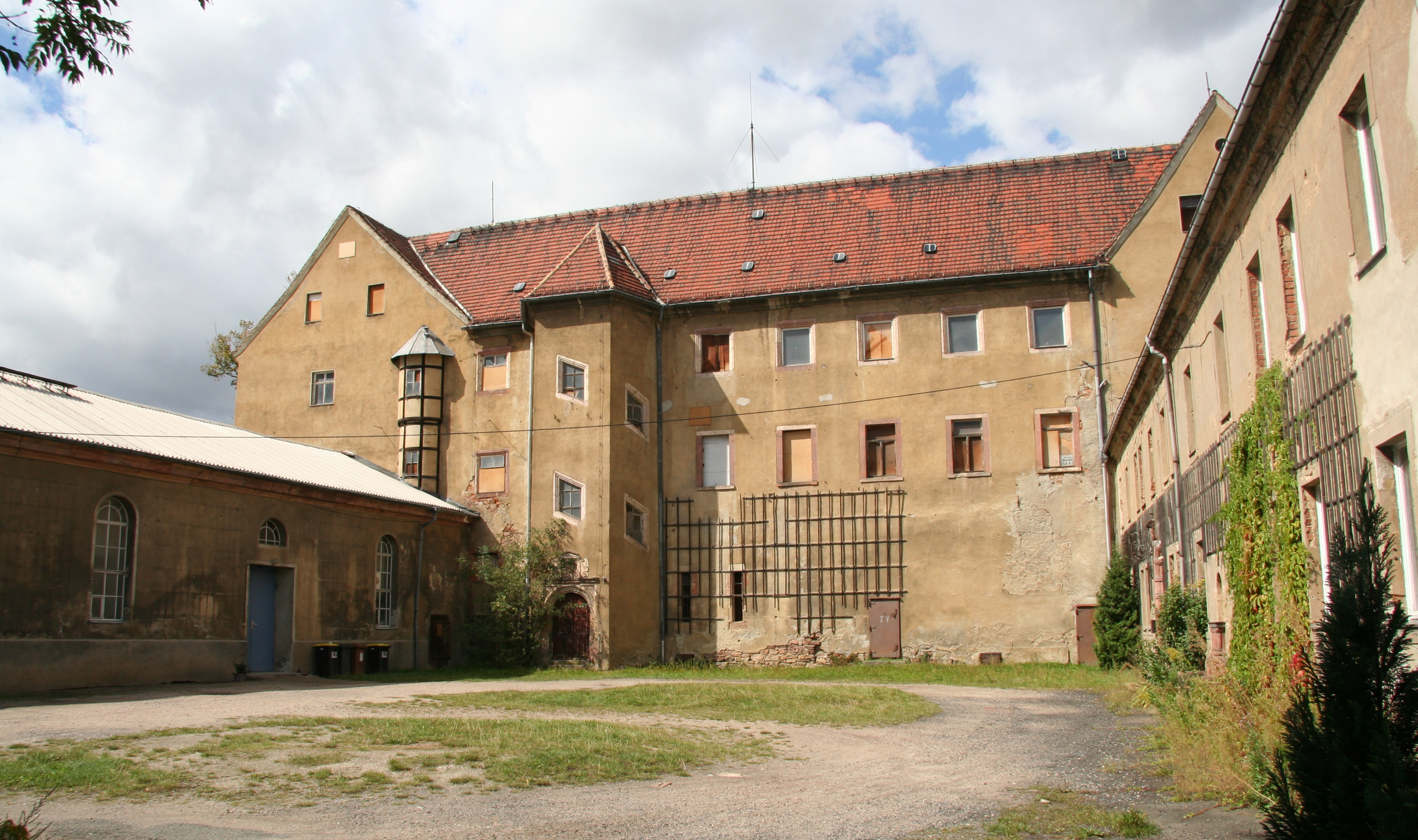
The Old Castle at Penig

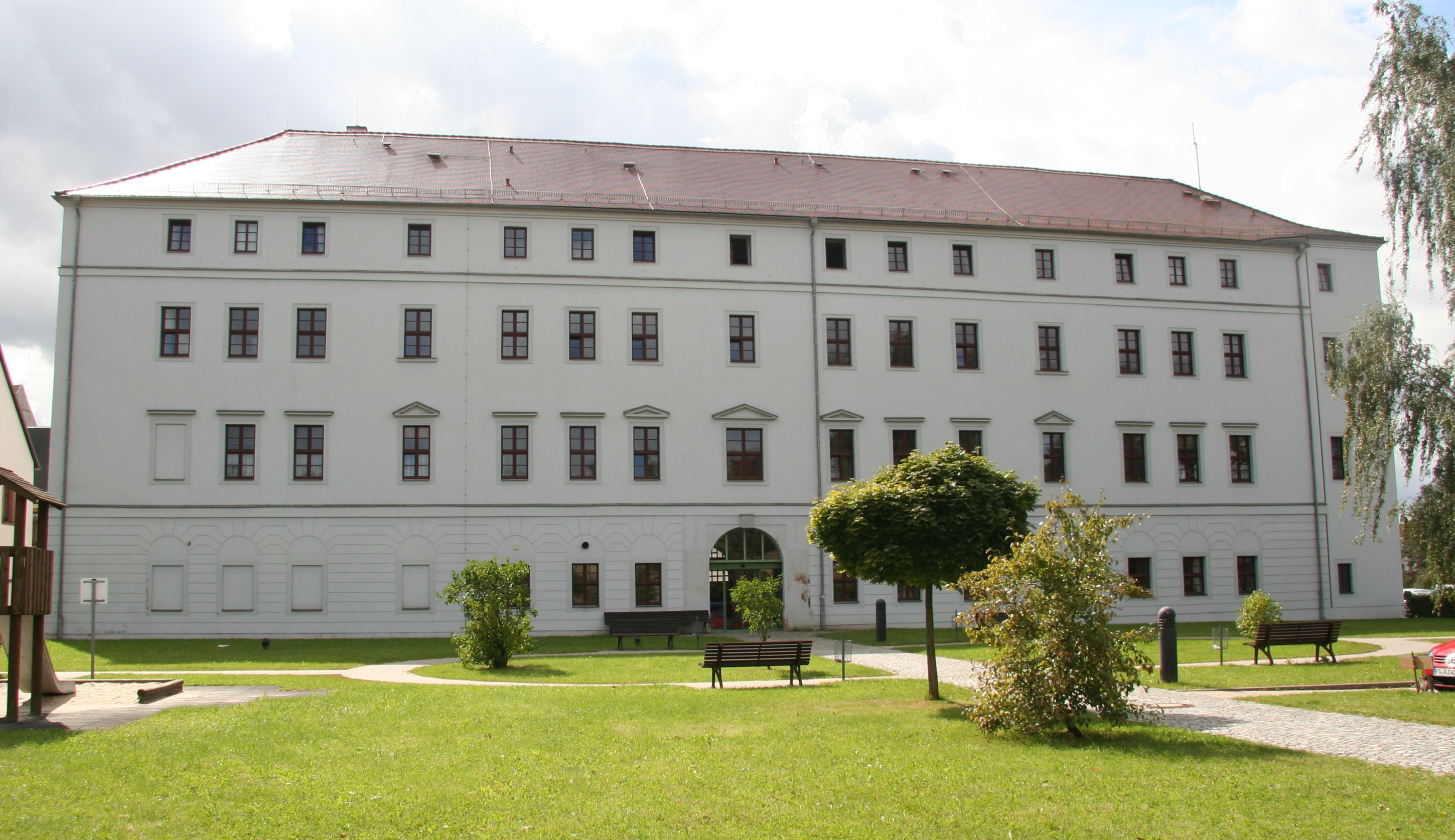
The New Castle at Penig

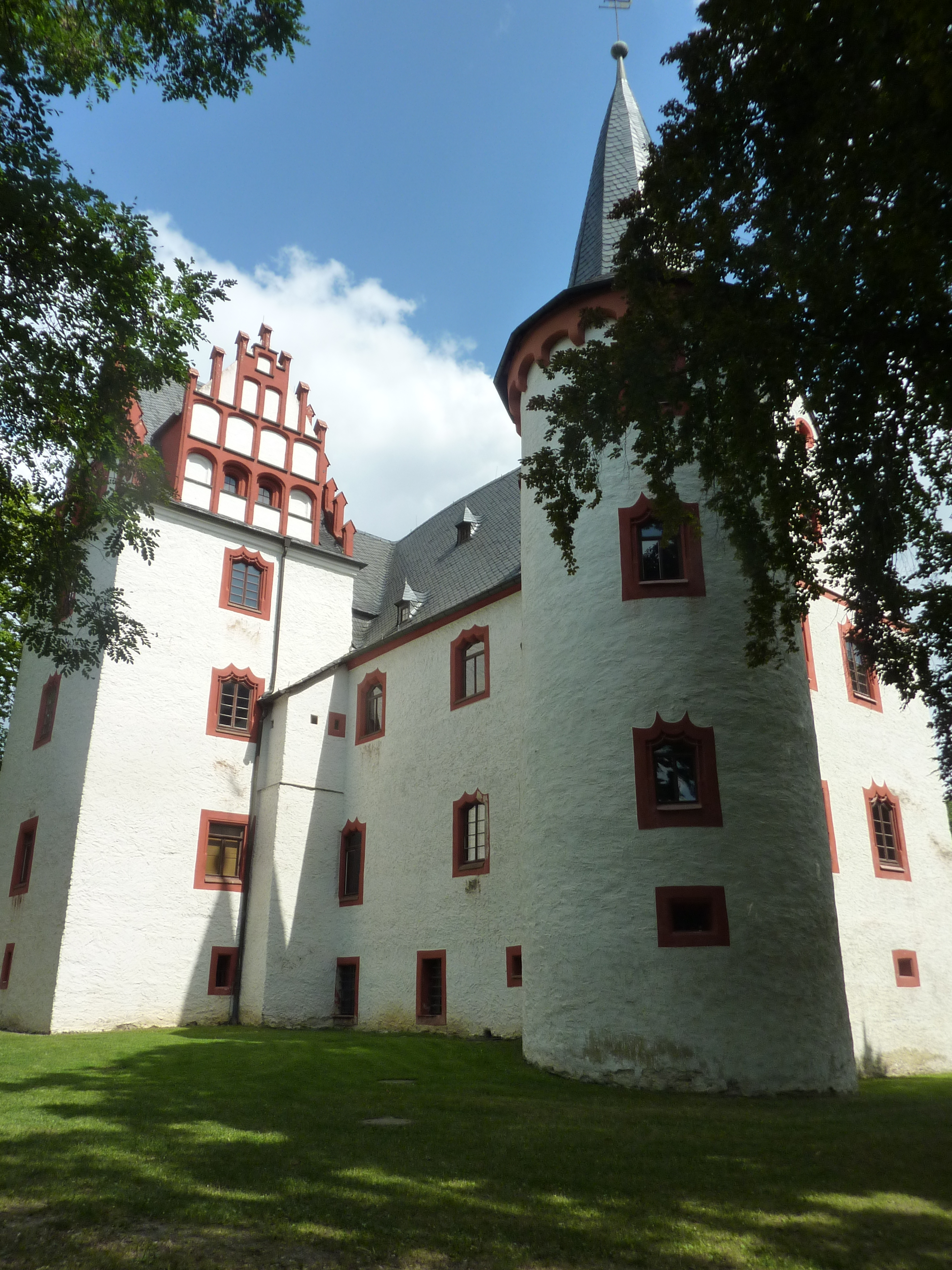
Castle Netzschkau

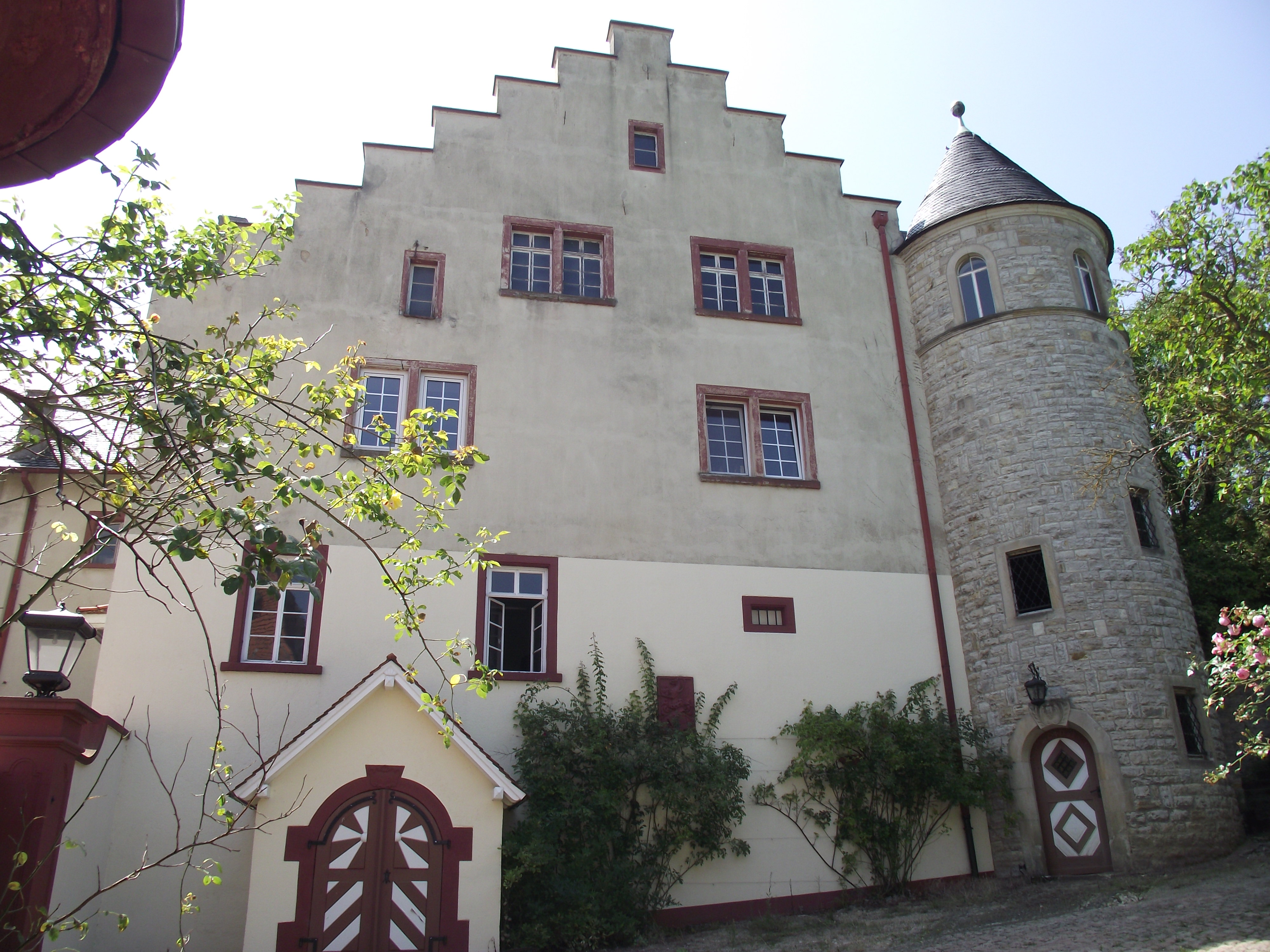
Castle Westerhaus

== Territory ==
The territory over time expanded to 15 square miles (39 km^{2}). The same space today has 14 communities and 61,000 residents. The largest portion was a Saxon fiefdom.

=== Changes in status ===
In 1569, the lordship was partitioned into Upper and Lower Schönburg. In 1700, Upper Schönburg was raised to the status of a county. At a meeting of the Saxon estates in 1740, Saxony assumed legal and military guardianship of the Schönburg lordship and over the next decade the estate was integrated into the Saxon legal and judicial structure. The old Upper Schönburg was partitioned to Schönburg-Hartenstein and Schönburg-Waldenburg in 1700.

The Soviet-directed agrarian land reform of September 1945 limited the size of any property, generally, to 1 square kilometer (0.39 sq mi). The Schönburg estates were confiscated, along with nearly 30,000 square kilometers (12,000 sq mi) of other land and property. After the German reunification, prince Alfred of Schönburg-Hartenstein (b. 1953) bought back Stein Castle in Hartenstein and Prince Alexander of Schönburg-Hartenstein Lichtenstein Castle.

=== Bohemian possessions ===
The Bohemian possessions included Údlice (Eidlitz), Ahníkov (Hagensdorf), Hasištejn (Hassenstein), Perštejn (Pürstein), Kadaň (Kaaden), Žacléř (Schatzlar), Trutnov (Trautenau) and Šumburk (Schönburg).

== Saga of the coat of arms ==
The origins of the family arms are not documented. According to "legend,"

...in the last battle, Charlemagne was hard-pressed against the Saxon Duke Wettekind. Most of his followers had already fallen, only he alone resisted the onslaught of the enemy. Suddenly, one of them struck his shield with a stone-like fist and it splintered into pieces. Charlemagne had only his sword for his defense. One of his fallen companions lifted his shield for Charlemagne’s defense. Immediately after the battle was won, Charlemagne discovered that the man who saved him had survived, and recognized him as a Schönburg. Charlemagne took a simple silver shield without markings. Using three finger--his ring, middle and pointing finger of his right hand--which was wounded and bloody, he stroked twice over the silver shield, so that there were two red stripes, and said, “Schönburg, this is from now forward your Mark, blood on the Coat of arms of your house.

== Partial list of notable family members ==
- Friedrich von Schönburg (died 1312), Count of Kaaden
- Adelheid von Dohna (died 15 June 1342/52), born von Schönburg-Glauchau, Countess, Wife of Otto (Heide)
- Alois Fürst von Schönburg-Hartenstein (1858–1944), Austrian lieutenant general
- Princess Anna Louise of Schönburg-Waldenburg (1871-1951), last Princess of Schhwarzburg
- Princess Alice of Schönburg-Waldenburg, (1876-1975), born Princess of Bourbon and later Princess of Schönburg-Waldenburg.
- Princess Sophie of Schönburg-Waldenburg and Albania (1885–1936), born Princess von Schönburg-Waldenburg and after Princess of Albania.
- Joachim, Count von Schönburg-Glauchau (1929–1998), writer, CDU member of the Bundestag 1990–1994
- Beatrix, Countess of Schönburg-Glauchau (1920–2021), socialite, wife of Joachim
- Countess Maya von Schönburg-Glauchau (born 1958), German socialite
- Gloria, Countess of Schönburg-Glauchau, Princess of Thurn and Taxis (born 1960), German socialite, painter, and Catholic activist
- Alexander, Count von Schönburg-Glauchau (born 1969), German journalist and writer
- Christoph, Count von Schönburg-Glauchau (born 1962), Federal prize winner (films) 2005, sound designer of the Oscar-winning film "The Lives of Others" (2007)
- Anna Luisa, Princess of Schönburg-Waldenburg, married to Don Fabrizo Pignatelli della Leonessa dei Principi di Monteroduni, Italian Ambassador to Guatemala and Honduras, born 1952, novelist

== Bibliography ==
- Enno Bünz (2007). "Schönburg, von". Neue Deutsche Biographie (in German). Vol. 23. Berlin: Duncker & Humblot. pp. 399–401.
- Konrad Müller: Schönburg. Die Geschichte des Hauses bis zur Reformation, Leipzig 1931.
- Matthias Frickert: Die Nachkommen des 1. Fürsten von Schönburg. Klaus Adam, Glauchau 1992.
- Heinrich Graesse: Deutsche Adelsgeschichte. Reprint-Verlag, Leipzig 1999 (Reprint d. Ausg. von 1876), ISBN 3-8262-0704-1.
- Hermann Grote: Herren, Grafen und Fürsten von Schönburg, in: Stammtafeln mit Anhang, Calendarium medii aevi, S. 252 f., Leipzig 1877, Nachdruck: ISBN 3-921695-59-7.
- Adolph Grützner: Monographie über das fürstliche und gräfliche Haus Schönburg. Leipzig 1847.
- Otto Posse: Die Urahnen des Fürstlichen und Gräflichen Hauses Schönburg. Dresden 1914.
- Walter Schlesinger: Die Schönburgischen Lande bis zum Ausgang des Mittelalters. Schriften für Heimatforschung 2, Dresden 1935.
- Walter Schlesinger: Die Landesherrschaft der Herren von Schönburg. Eine Studie zur Geschichte des Staates in Deutschland. Quellen und Studien zur Verfassungsgeschichte des Deutschen Reiches in Mittelalter und Neuzeit IX/1, Böhlau, Münster/Köln 1954.
- Theodor Schön: Geschichte des Fürstlichen und Gräflichen Gesamthauses Schönburg. Urkundenbuch Bd. 1-8, Nachtragsband. Stuttgart/Waldenburg, 1901ff.
- Michael Wetzel: Schönburgische Herrschaften. Beiheft zur Karte C III 6 des Atlas zur Geschichte und Landeskunde von Sachsen. Leipzig/Dresden 2007, ISBN 978-3-89679-610-3.
- Genealogisches Handbuch des Adels, Adelslexikon Band XIII, Band 128 der Gesamtreihe, C. A. Starke Verlag, Limburg (Lahn) 2002, ISSN 0435-2408
- Joachim Bahlcke u. a.: Handbuch der historischen Stätten Böhmen und Mähren, Kröner-Verlag, Stuttgart 1998, ISBN 3-520-32901-8, S. 864.
- Johann Georg Theodor Grässe: Geschlechts-, Namen- und Wappensagen des Adels deutscher Nation, Verlag Schönfeld, 1876, S. 142–143.
