= Elisabeth von Thurn und Taxis =

German socialite and writer (born 1982)

Princess Elisabeth
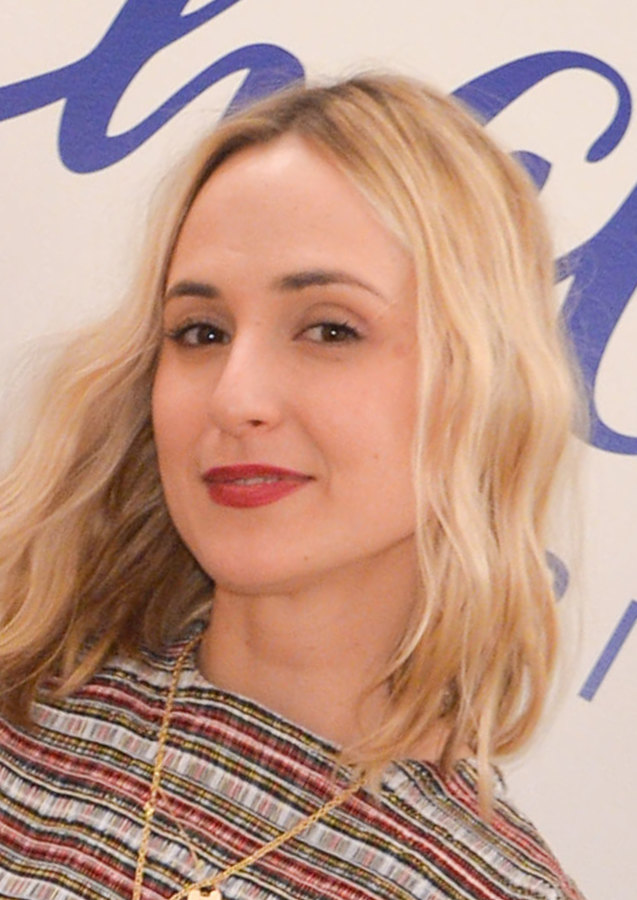
- Princess Elisabeth in 2016
- Born: 24 March 1982 (age 44); Schloss Thurn und Taxis, Regensburg, Bavaria, Germany
Names
- Elisabeth Margarete Maria Anna Beatriz Prinzessin von Thurn und Taxis
- House: Thurn and Taxis
- Father: Johannes, 11th Prince of Thurn und Taxis
- Mother: Countess Gloria von Schönburg-Glauchau
- Religion: Catholic
- Occupation: Journalist; author; socialite

Princess Elisabeth von Thurn und Taxis (Elisabeth Margarete Maria Anna Beatriz Prinzessin von Thurn und Taxis; born 24 March 1982) is a German journalist, author, socialite, and art collector.

By birth, as the daughter of Johannes, 11th Prince of Thurn and Taxis, she is a member of the German princely House of Thurn and Taxis. Since 2012 Elisabeth has worked as a style editor-at-large for Vogue. A traditionalist Catholic, she has written as a columnist for Vatican Magazine and authored a book on Catholic spirituality called The Faith of Children: in Praise of the People's Devotion. She has been referred to in the press as Princess TNT, a nickname once associated with her mother, Gloria, Princess of Thurn und Taxis.

== Biography ==
=== Early life and family ===
Princess Elisabeth von Thurn und Taxis was born on 24 March 1982 at Schloss Thurn und Taxis, a 500-room palace in Regensburg owned by her family, the Princely House of Thurn and Taxis. She is the second child of Johannes, 11th Prince of Thurn and Taxis and Countess Gloria von Schönburg-Glauchau. She has an older sister, Princess Maria Theresia, and a younger brother, Prince Albert, who succeeded their father in 1990 as the 12th Prince of Thurn und Taxis.

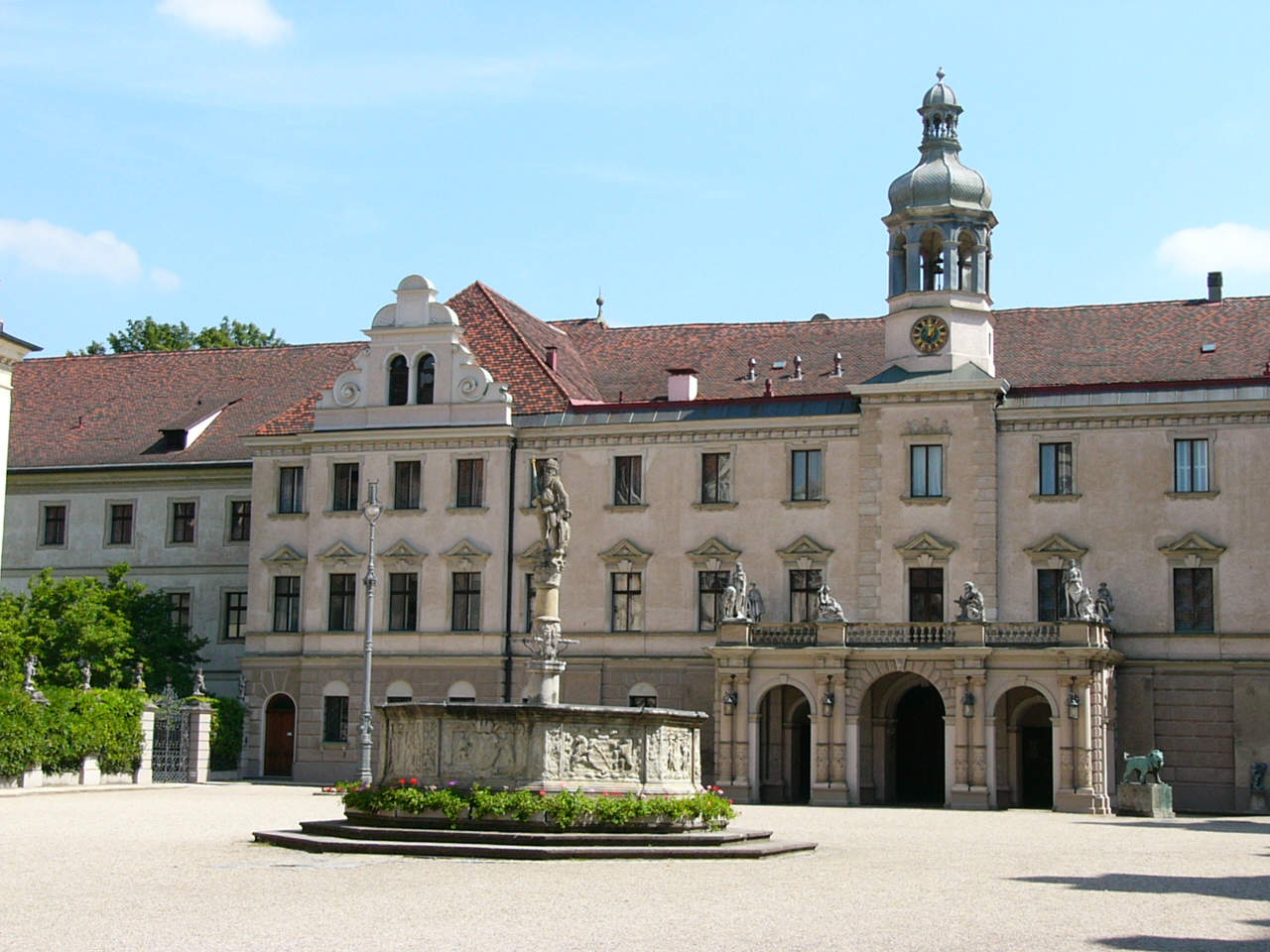
St. Emmeram's Abbey, Elisabeth's birthplace.

Until 1918, the House of Thurn and Taxis held the rank of royalty in the German Empire, where they once owned the continental postal system as an Imperial fief. As they were required to intermarry with other reigning or once-reigning dynasties, Elisabeth's mother is of similar background. Through her father, she is a descendant of Leopold II, Holy Roman Emperor, John VI of Portugal, Louis Philippe, King of the French and Charles IV of Spain. Through her mother, by birth a member of a mediatised comital dynasty, Elisabeth descends from the houses of the Russian princely families Golitsyn and Meshchersky and the German princes of Reuss. The House of Thurn and Taxis is one of Germany's wealthiest and most prominent families. From her maternal side, she is a descendant of the House of Schönburg. Her mother is the daughter of the politician and journalist Joachim, Count of Schonburg-Glauchau, as well as the sister of socialite Countess Maya von Schönburg-Glauchau and author Alexander, Count of Schonburg-Glauchau, a grandnephew by marriage of Queen Elizabeth II. Through her maternal grandmother, Countess Beatrix Széchenyi de Sárvár-Felsővidék, she is a descendant of Count István Széchenyi.

During her childhood, Elisabeth and her siblings were frequent guests of Michael Jackson at his Neverland Ranch, visits she recalled in her blog after his death in 2009. Describing Jackson as "excruciatingly shy", she defended his reputation, writing, "I couldn't imagine Michael hurting a fly, let alone a friend."

Elisabeth was educated at Sevenoaks School in Kent, England, and has a bachelor's degree in media and communication studies from the American University of Paris.

=== Career ===
Elisabeth worked as a features editor for the London-based Finch’s Quarterly Review and penned a blog, "The Princess Diaries", for Finch's until departing in 2010. The blog contrasted the expectations, pleasures, difficulties and assumptions surrounding "princess" status with more "normal" issues like flat-hunting, London weather, and work. Elisabeth also contributed a monthly column in Vogue and articles for German and international art and style publications, including New York-based style magazine Quest.

A devout Catholic, Elisabeth has written for the British Catholic Herald about the revival of traditionalist Catholic religious communities in France, as well as a monthly column in Vatican Magazine. She signed a 2008 petition asking the bishops of England and Wales to provide more Latin Sunday Tridentine Masses. In December 2010, she published a liturgical volume titled The Faith of Children: in Praise of the People's Devotion. The book, which featured a foreword by Pope Benedict XVI's elder brother, Georg Ratzinger, was published in Italian and German.

In 2011, her blog posts from Finch’s Quarterly Review were translated into German and published as a book titled Tagebuch einer Prinzessin.

In 2012, she began working as a contributing style editor for fashion magazine Vogue. In March 2015, she drew media criticism when she shared a photo on Instagram of what appears to be a homeless woman in Paris reading an issue of Vogue, which she posted with the comment, "Paris is full of surprises....and @voguemagazine readers even in unexpected corners!" She later deleted the photo and apologised on Twitter for causing any offense.

In October 2019 Elisabeth curated Sotheby's Magnificent Jewels and Noble Jewels sale in Geneva.

=== Personal life ===
Elisabeth has frequently featured in socialite diary items and appeared in a Vanity Fair article entitled "Fortune's Children" in June 2009, photographed by Bruce Weber. "I think it's a huge privilege to be able to use the access that we have in an interesting way", she said, discussing a book about art collectors she is writing in collaboration with her cousin, photographer Alex Flick.

Elisabeth has resided in New York City, London, and Rome.

== Decorations ==
- Dame of Honour and Devotion in Obedience of the Sovereign Military Hospitaller Order of Saint John of Jerusalem, of Rhodes and of Malta.
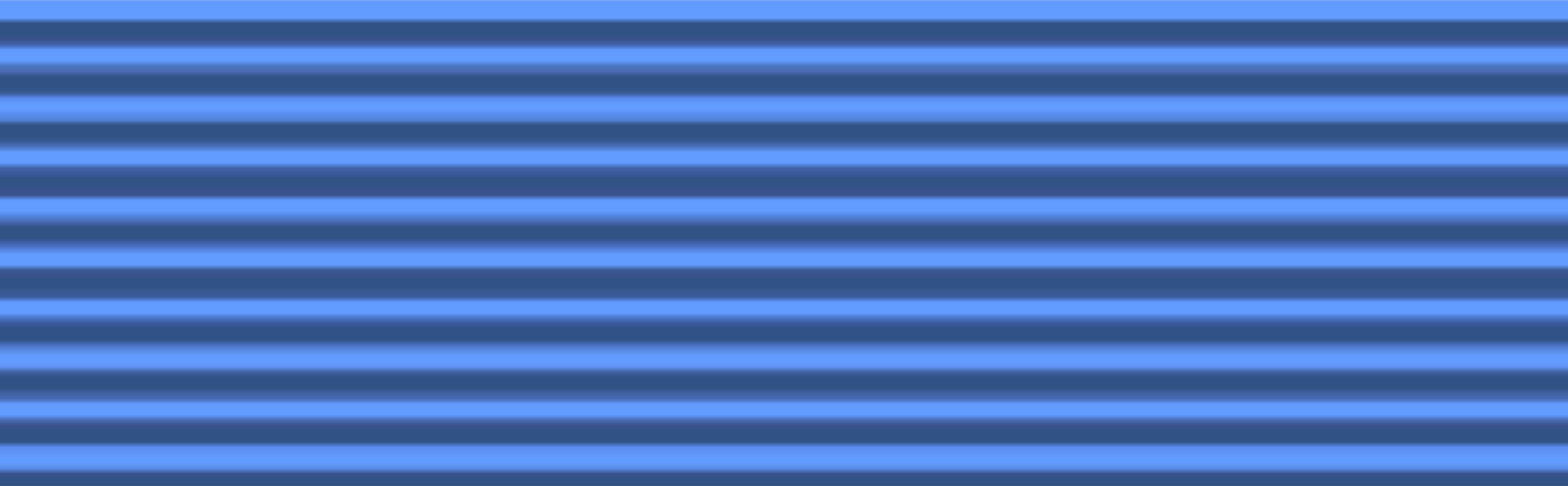
- Dame Grand Cross of the Order of Perfect Friendship.

== Books ==
- Tagebuch einer Prinzessin. (The Princess Diaries). Marion von Schröder. Berlin, 2011, ISBN 978-3-548-37473-4
- Fromm! Eine Einladung, das Katholische wieder mit allen Sinnen zu erleben. With a foreword by Georg Ratzinger, epilogue by Mgr. Wilhelm Imkamp. Kisslegg, 2009, ISBN 978-3-939684-61-9
