= Bruce Nauman =

American sculptor and performance artist

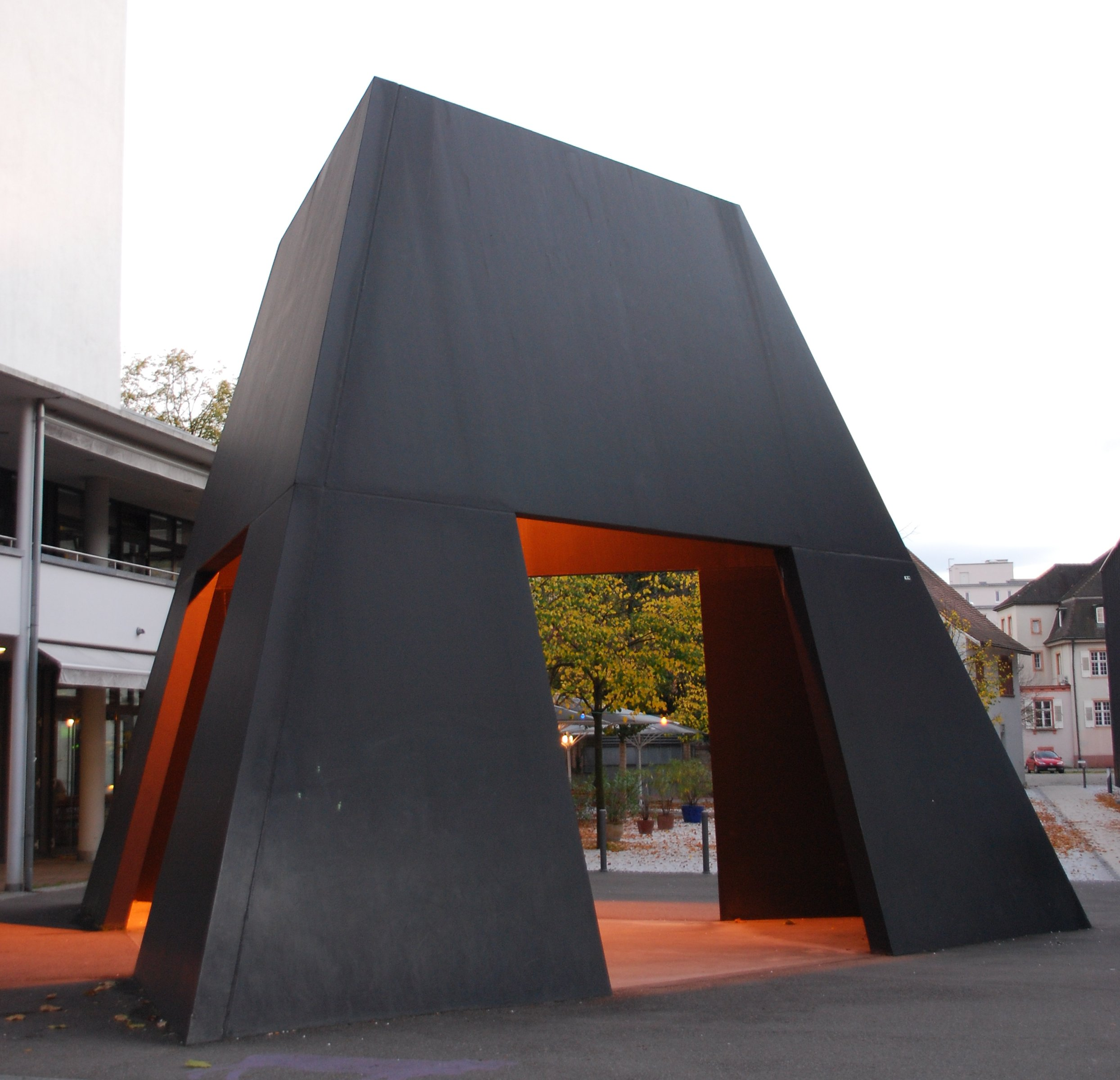
- Truncated Pyramid Room (1982/1998) in Lörrach, Germany
- Born: December 6, 1941 (age 84); Fort Wayne, Indiana, US
- Education: University of Wisconsin–Madison and University of California, Davis
- Known for: sculpture, photography, neon, video, drawing, printmaking and performance
- Notable work: La air, 1970, Human/Need/Desire, 1983
- Awards: Larry Aldrich Award, Golden Lion at 53rd Venice Biennale

Bruce Nauman (born December 6, 1941) is an American artist. His practice spans a broad range of media including sculpture, photography, neon, video, drawing, printmaking, and performance. Nauman lives near Galisteo, New Mexico.

== Life and work ==
Nauman was born in Fort Wayne, Indiana, but his father's work as an engineer for General Electric meant that the family moved often. He studied mathematics and physics at the University of Wisconsin–Madison (1960–64), and art with William T. Wiley and Robert Arneson at the University of California, Davis (1965–6). In 1964, he gave up painting to dedicate himself to sculpture, performance and cinema collaborations with William Allan and Robert Nelson. He worked as an assistant to Wayne Thiebaud. Upon graduation (MFA, 1966), he taught at the San Francisco Art Institute from 1966 to 1968, and at the University of California, Irvine in 1970. In 1968, he met the singer and performance artist Meredith Monk and signed with the dealer Leo Castelli. Nauman moved from Northern California to Pasadena in 1969. In 1979, Nauman further moved to Pecos, New Mexico. In 1989, he established a home and studio in Galisteo, New Mexico, where he continued to work and live with his second wife, the painter Susan Rothenberg, until her death in 2020. Nauman has two children, Erik and Zoë, with his first wife, Judy Govan, and he also has two grandchildren.

Confronted with "What to do?" in his studio soon after graduating, Nauman had the simple but profound realization that "If I was an artist and I was in the studio, then whatever I was doing in the studio must be art. At this point art became more of an activity and less of a product." Nauman set up a studio in a former grocery shop in the Mission district of San Francisco and then in a sublet from his university tutor in Mill Valley. These two locations provided the setting for a series of performed actions which he captured in real time, on a fixed camera, over the 10-minute duration of a 16mm film reel. Between 1966 and 1970, he made several videos, in which he used his body to explore the potentials of art and the role of the artist, and to investigate psychological states and behavioural codes.

Much of his work is characterized by an interest in language, often manifesting itself as visual puns. He has an interest in setting the metaphoric and descriptive functions of language against each other, which he also derives from the philosophy of Ludwig Wittgenstein and his concept of the language game. For example, the neon Run From Fear – Fun From Rear, or the photograph Bound To Fail, which literalizes the title phrase and shows the artist's arms tied behind his back. He seems to be fascinated by the nature of communication and language's inherent problems, as well as the role of the artist as supposed communicator and manipulator of visual symbols.

In the 1960s, Nauman began to exhibit his work at Nicholas Wilder's gallery in Los Angeles and in New York at Leo Castelli in 1968 along with early solo shows at the Los Angeles County Museum of Art and the Whitney Museum in 1972.

Nauman's use of neon as a medium recurs in his works over the decades. He uses neon to make allusions to the numinous connotations of light, similar to Mario Merz, who used neon to bring new life to assemblages of mundane objects. Neon also connotes the public atmosphere by the means of advertising, and in his later works he uses it ironically with private, erotic imagery as seen in his Hanged Man (1985).

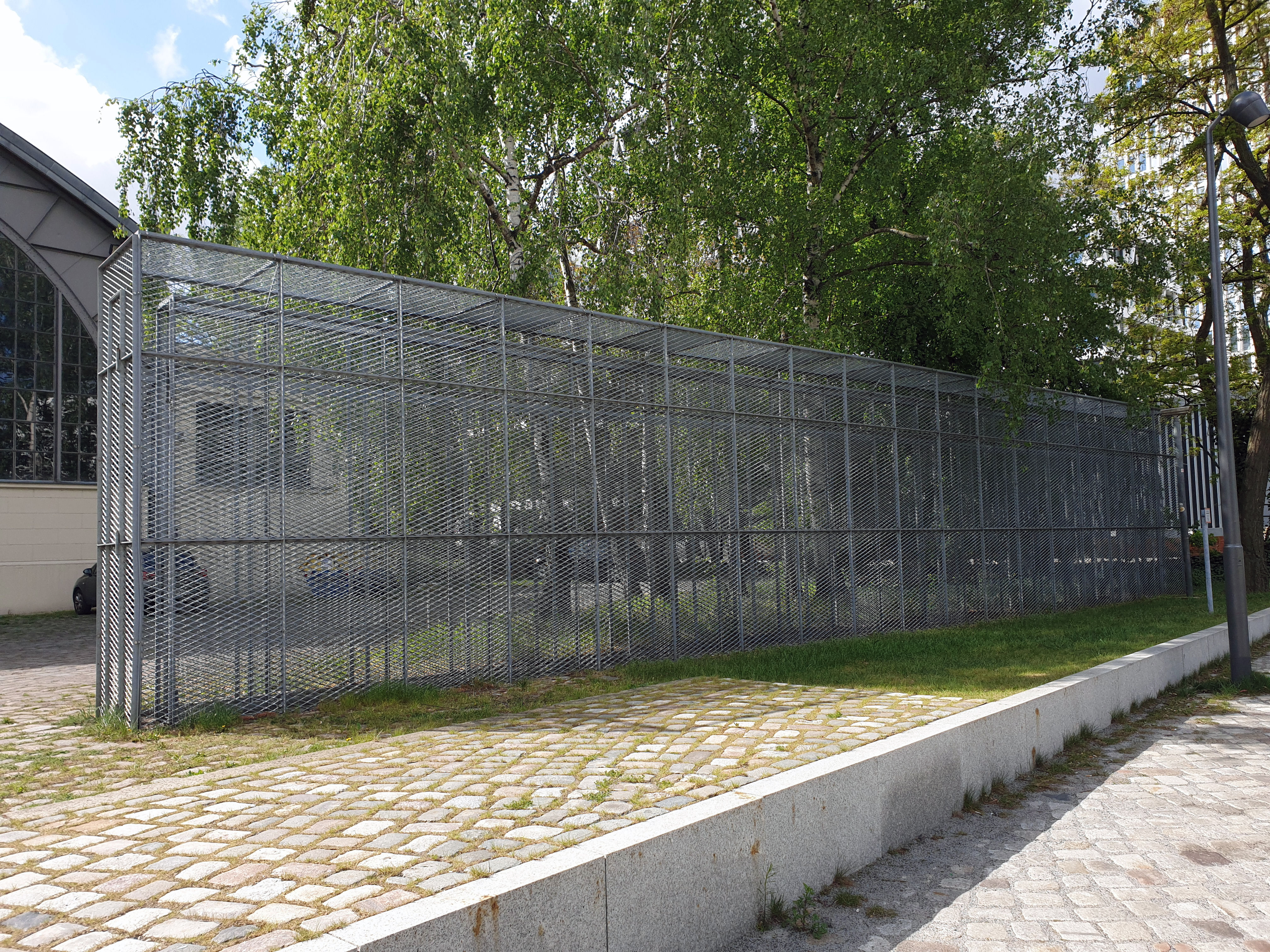
Skulptur Invalidenstr 50 (Mitte) Double Cage Piece, Bruce Nauman, 1974

His Self Portrait as a Fountain (1966) shows the artist spouting a stream of water from his mouth. At the end of the 1960s, Nauman began constructing claustrophobic and enclosed corridors and rooms that could be entered by visitors and which evoked the experience of being locked in and of being abandoned. A series of works inspired by one of the artist's dreams was brought together under the title of Dream Passage and created in 1983, 1984, and 1988. In his installation Changing Light Corridor with Rooms (1971), a long corridor is shrouded in darkness, whilst two rooms on either side are illuminated by bulbs that are timed to flash at different rates.

Since the mid-1980s, primarily working with sculpture and video, Nauman developed disturbing psychological and physical themes incorporating images of animal and human body parts, depicting sadistic allusions to games and torture together with themes of surveillance. In 1988, after a hiatus of nearly two decades focused on time-based media, he resumed his work with cast objects.

=== Selected works ===
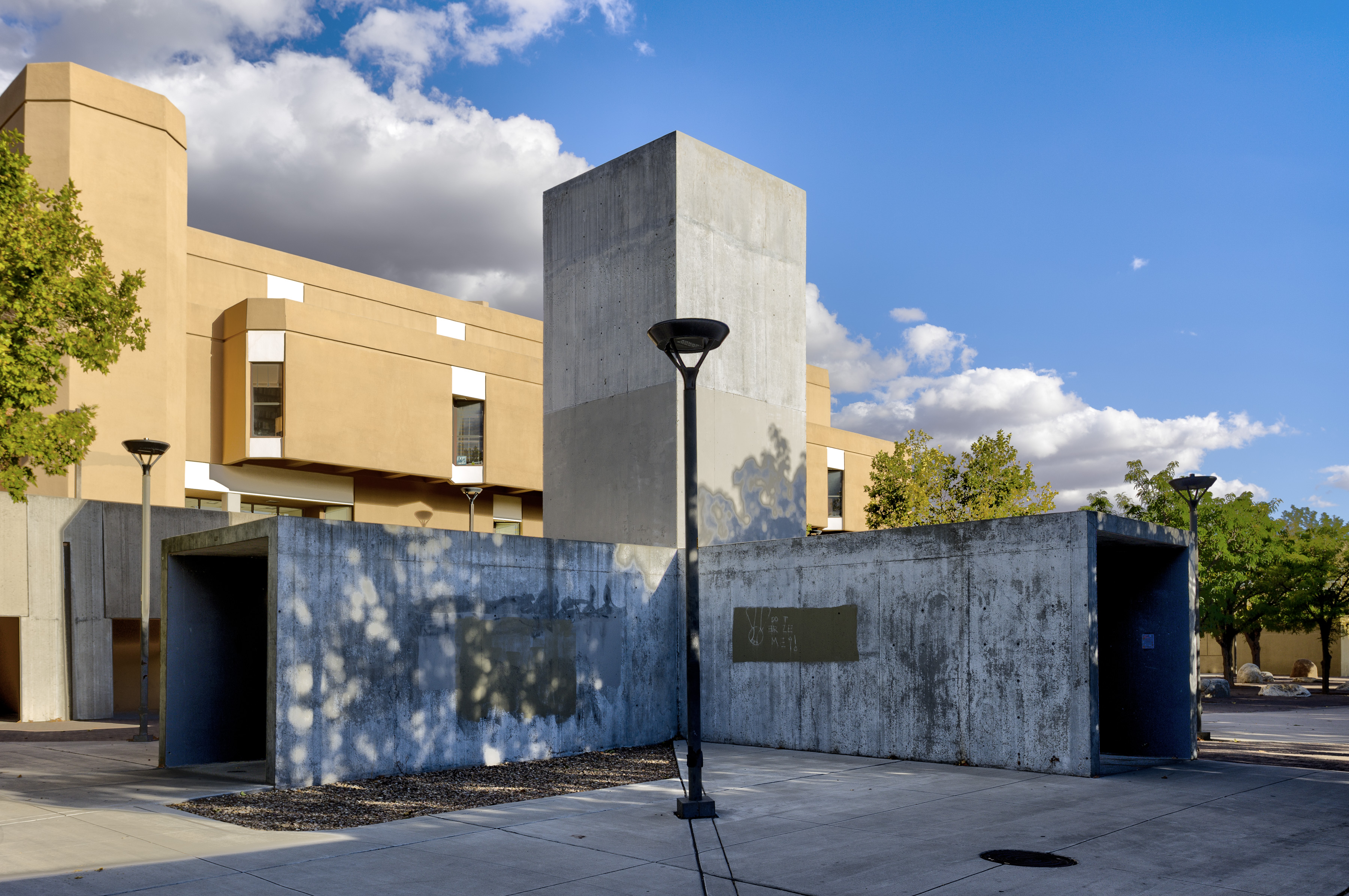
Center of the Universe at the University of New Mexico

Some of Nauman's best-known works include:

- A Rose Has No Teeth (1966) — Lead, 7.5 x 8 x 2.25 in.
- Eleven Color Photographs (1966-1967/1970) — Portfolio of eleven color photographs, various sizes, all approx. 19.75 x 23 in. edition of 8 Published by Leo Castelli Gallery, New York
- Art Make-Up (1967) — video in which Nauman slowly covers his face and upper torso with white, then pink, then green, then black makeup, until by the end he looks like a negative image Initially the films were intended to be projected simultaneously on four walls of a room. Although this form of installation was never realized for this piece, Nauman employed the method for subsequent film and video installations.
- The True Artist Helps the World by Revealing Mystic Truths (1967) – a spiraling neon sign with this slogan.
- Flesh to White to Black to Flesh (1968) 51 minutes b&w, sound. Nauman puts on white makeup, then black makeup, then returns to his ordinary skin color.
- Burning Small Fires (1969) — artist's book for which Nauman burned Ed Ruscha's book Various Small Fires and Milk (1964), photographed it, and edited a book of his own.
- Wall-Floor Positions (1969) — Videotape, black and white, sound, 60 mins. to be repeated continuously.
- Pacing Upside Down(1969) 60 minutes b&w. With his arms held over his head, hands crossed, Nauman is moving jerkily around a perimeter defined by a square drawn on the studio floor, filmed by a fixed camera, placed upside down.
- Audio Video Piece for London, Ontario (1969–70) - Nauman uses a closed-circuit television, a camera, and an audio recording to confuse sensory perception as the television broadcasts images and rhythmic noises of an adjoining room.
- LA AIR (1970) – A soft-cover artist's book, featuring only 10 color illustrations [photographs] of the polluted Los Angeles skyline. It complements and extends the sky-blue pages of Nauman's earlier book CLEA RSKY (1968–69). No text.
- Henry Moore Bound to Fail (1967–1970) – cast wax relief of a man's back with arms tied by ropes. In 2001, this work sold for $9 million at auction. This is one of the highest prices paid for Nauman's work.
- Please/Pay/Attention/Please (1973) - Collage and letraset, 27.5 x 27.5 in.
- Elke allowing the floor to rise up over her face (1973) 39 minutes color sound. She lies on her back, turns over, moves around as the video makes her seem to sink below the floor.
- Tony Sinking into the Floor, Face Up, and Face Down (1973) 60 minutes. Tony lies there as if dead, then slowly wakes up, as the editing makes him seem to sink into the floor.
- Center of the Universe (1988) - "unadorned concrete tunnels extending outward from a plaque in the middle and one reaching up toward the blue New Mexico sky." At the University of New Mexico, Albuquerque.
- Good Boy Bad Boy (1985) — Two video monitors, two videotape players, two videotapes (color, sound). dimensions variable.
- Clown Torture (1987) – in four separate stacked video screens, a clown screaming "No" repeatedly, a clown telling an annoying children's joke, a clown balancing goldfish bowls, and a clown sitting on a public toilet.
- Vices and Virtues (1988) – Atop the Charles Lee Powell Structural Systems Laboratory on the campus of the University of California, San Diego as part of the Stuart Collection of public art: neon signs seven feet tall, alternating the seven vices and seven virtues: FAITH/LUST, HOPE/ENVY, CHARITY/SLOTH, PRUDENCE/PRIDE, JUSTICE/AVARICE, TEMPERANCE/GLUTTONY, and FORTITUDE/ANGER.
- Learned Helplessness in Rats (Rock and Roll Drummer) (1988) – Plexiglass maze, closed circuit video camera, video projector, two videotape players, two monitors, and two videotapes. Collection of MOMA.
- Animal Pyramid (1989) – a stack of seventeen taxidermy molds rising to twelve feet.
- World Peace (1996) – five projectors or video players displaying four women and a man each speaking simultaneous monologues about world peace and endlessly rehearsing the words 'We'll talk – They'll listen / You'll talk – We'll listen / They'll talk – You'll listen'.
- Stadium Piece (1998–99) – outdoor M-shaped staircase, part of the Western Washington University Public Sculpture Collection
- Setting a Good Corner (Allegory & Metaphor) (1999) – looping video of the artist setting a corner fencepost.
- Mapping the Studio I (Fat Chance John Cage) (2001) – multiple projections record nocturnal activity by the artist's cat and various mice in his studio over the summer of 2000.
- Raw Materials (2004) – sound installation displayed in the Turbine Hall of Tate Modern, bringing together 21 audio pieces made over a period of 40 years.
- One Hundred Fish Fountain (2005) comprises hollow bronze fish, cast from catfish, bass, whitefish and other species, suspended by wires from the ceiling at different heights, as if swimming in deep water. Below them is a broad, shallow basin, cobbled together from rubber sheeting, which measures 25 feet by 28 feet, from which water is pumped up to each fish through a hose connected to its belly. The environmentally scaled sculpture all but fills the room, allowing just a narrow track for the viewer to edge around the perimeter, in much the same way as Nauman's early corridor works first invited then restricted movement.
- Untitled "Leave the Land Alone" (1969/2009) – premiered as a public skywriting project over Pasadena for the Armory Center for the Arts in September 2009, initiated by curator Andrew Berardini. The plane circled around and rewrote the brief sentence "Leave the Land Alone" several times. This work connects with LAAIR as well as lambastes the land art movement
- Days/Giorni (2009) – two rows of wafer-thin white speakers that played 14 recordings of seven people chanting the days of the week, either in English ("Days") or Italian ("Giorni"). Purchased in a 50–50 deal by the Museum of Modern Art in New York and Maja Oeri, a MoMA trustee whose Emanuel Hoffmann Foundation is at the Schaulager in Basel, Switzerland.
- For Beginners (all the combinations of the thumb and fingers) (2010) – video depicting Nauman's hands enacting all the possible combinations of the four fingers and thumb – 31 positions in all – accompanied by his verbal enumeration of each finger combination. Purchased in a 50–50 deal by François Pinault and LACMA.
- For Beginners (instructed piano) (2010) — sound piece featuring a tentative piano solo by the artist-musician Terry Allen.

=== Commissions ===
In 1990, the Greater Des Moines Public Art Foundation commissioned a cast bronze version of Nauman's Animal Pyramid (1989), a stack of seventeen taxidermy molds rising to twelve feet. It is installed in the grounds of the Des Moines Art Center, Iowa.

The Greater Des Moines Public Art Foundation commissioned the 12-foot-high cast-bronze sculpture Animal Pyramid in 1990 for the Des Moines Art Center.

== Collections ==
Nauman's work is in the collections of the Art Institute of Chicago; Kunstmuseum Basel; the Hallen für Neue Kunst Schaffhausen; Kunsthaus, Zürich; Hamburger Bahnhof/Friedrich Christian Flick Collection, Berlin; Museum Brandhorst, Munich; Centre Pompidou, Paris; the Solomon R. Guggenheim Museum and the Museum of Modern Art in New York; the Hirshhorn Museum and Sculpture Garden in Washington, DC; Museum of Contemporary Art, Chicago;Tate Modern in London, New Mexico Museum of Art, di Rosa, and the Walker Art Center, among many others.

== Recognition ==
Fifteen Pairs of Hands (1996) in the collection of the National Gallery of Art

Bruce Nauman holds honorary Doctor of Fine Arts degrees from the San Francisco Art Institute and the California Institute of the Arts. His awards include:

- 1993 - Wolf Prize for his distinguished work as a sculptor and his extraordinary contribution to twentieth-century art
- 1994 - the Wexner Prize
- 1999 - Golden Lion of the Venice Biennale.
- 2004 - Praemium Imperiale for sculpture
- 2008 - United States Bureau of Educational and Cultural Affairs (ECA) announced the selection of Bruce Nauman as the American representative to the 2009 Venice Biennale where he won the prestigious Golden Lion.
- 2014 - Austrian Frederick Kiesler Prize for Architecture and the Arts

Time named Nauman one of their 100 most influential people in 2004. In 2006, Artfacts.net ranked Nauman as number one among living artists, followed by Gerhard Richter and Robert Rauschenberg. In 2013, Complex ranked Wall-Floor Positions the 19th best work of performance art in history.

== Influences ==
Nauman has cited as major influences the following writers, philosophers, and artists:

- HC Westermann
- Samuel Beckett
- Ludwig Wittgenstein - Throughout Nauman's long career, to a greater or lesser extent, Nauman has credited Wittgenstein as an influence of his work. He has spoken of this influence in several interviews. In a 1970 interview Nauman speaks to the broader sense of Wittgenstein's influence: "Just the way Wittgenstein proceeds in thinking about things, his awareness of how to think about things. I don't think you can point to any specific piece that's the result of reading Wittgenstein, but it has to do with some sort of process of how to go about thinking about things." This sentiment was also stated in a 1980 article. Nauman makes these statements even though he has pointed to a piece that was directly influenced, in a 1966 interview where Nauman speaks about the piece "A rose has no teeth", the title of which was a direct quote from one of Wittgenstein's "language games". This relationship is something that art writers have continued to see in his work throughout his career, especially in his linguistic works, whether written or spoken. Arthur C. Danto speaks of Nauman's work and his relationship to Wittgenstein in an article written in 1995: "A great deal of the work of Bruce Nauman consists in issuing commands ... it is perhaps helpful to consider those works as having at times the framework and logic of language games — which means, since the works are often directed at us, that we are meant to do something in response ... designed as language games, they address us less as viewers than participants. To experience a Nauman is to interact with it in some way that goes beyond appreciating it as a work of art." In a similar line of thinking, Janet Kraynak in the book "Please pay attention please" makes a case that a set of works has a similar effect, by the fact that all the pieces "Contain Directive or imperative verbs, calling out 'You'", bringing the viewer into this language game that Nauman is setting up.
- John Cage
- Philip Glass
- La Monte Young
- Meredith Monk

Nauman was a part of the Process Art Movement.

== Art market ==
Nauman's earliest supporters, in the 1970s, were mainly European patrons and institutions, such as the Kunstmuseum Basel. Chicago-based collector Gerald Elliott was the first American to amass a sizable number of Naumans, including the 1966 plaster sculpture Mold for a Modernized Slant Step, all of which went to the Museum of Contemporary Art, Chicago, when he died in 1994. Emerging later as a prominent buyer was Friedrich Christian Flick, who collected more than 40 pieces from throughout Nauman's career.

Two of Nauman's early auction records were for monumental neons, both walls of blinking punning phrases: Sotheby's New York hammered down One Hundred Live and Die (1984) to the Benesse Art Site, in Naoshima, Japan, for $1.9 million in 1992, and five years later sold Good Boy/Bad Boy (1986–87) to the Daros Collection in Zürich for $2.2 million. Nauman's neon work Violins Violence Silence (1981/82) realized $4 million at Sotheby's New York in 2009.

By 2001, the sculpture Henry Moore Bound to Fail (1967), a wax and plaster cast of Nauman's own arms tied behind his back, had set a new auction record for postwar art when Christie's sold it for $9.9 million to François Pinault. In 2002, Sperone Westwater Gallery sold Mapping the Studio (Fat Chance John Cage) (2001), four videos showing Nauman's cat chasing mice during the night, for $1.2 million apiece to such museums as Tate Modern, London; Dia Art Foundation, New York; Kunstmuseum Basel; and Centre Pompidou, Paris.

Nauman is represented by Sperone Westwater Gallery, New York, and Galerie Konrad Fischer, Düsseldorf and Berlin (since 1968).
