= FQR =

FQR may refer to:

- Finch's Quarterly Review, an international luxury magazine which publishes articles about glamour and style
- First Quench Retailing, a defunct British retail chain
