= Alexander, Count of Schönburg-Glauchau =

German journalist and author

Alexander von Schönburg
- Count of Schönburg-Glauchau
- Born: August 15, 1969 (age 56); Mogadishu, Somalia
- Spouse: Princess Irina of Hesse (m. 1999)
- Issue: Countess Maria-Letitia; Count Maximus; Count Valentin
- Father: Joachim, Count of Schönburg-Glauchau
- Mother: Countess Beatrix Széchenyi de Sárvár-Felsővidék

Alexander, Count of Schönburg-Glauchau (born August 15, 1969), known professionally as Alexander von Schönburg, is a German journalist and writer. He is, after his older brother Carl's abdication, the current head of the comital branch of the princely House of Schönburg.

== Early life and family ==
Alexander was born in 1969 in Mogadishu, Somalia, to Joachim, Count von Schönburg-Glauchau, and his first wife, Countess Beatrix Széchenyi de Sárvár et Felsővidék (b. 1930). He is the youngest of four children from this marriage, after siblings Maya (b. 1958), Gloria (b. 1960), and Carl-Alban (b. 1966). Their parents divorced in 1986. Afterwards, Alexander's father married Ursula Zwicker, and their union produced a daughter, Anabel Maya-Felicitas.

During the second half of the 1960s, Alexander's father's profession as a foreign correspondent took the family to Togo. They later moved to Somalia, returning to Germany to live in 1970. The family thereafter resided in Meckenheim, in the Rhineland. Following the reunification of Germany in 1990, Alexander's father reclaimed the family's possessions in Saxony which had been taken from them after World War II. In later years, he was elected to the Bundestag.

Alexander's sisters, Maya and Gloria, famously wed wealthy trend setters: Maya was married to art patron Mick Flick until their divorce in 1993, while Gloria's husband was Johannes, 11th Prince of Thurn and Taxis, until his death in 1990. His father's younger brother, Count Rudolf ("Rudi", born 1932), wed Princess Marie Louise of Prussia (born 1945) in 1971, and succeeded Prince Alfonso of Hohenlohe-Langenburg as director of the Marbella Club Hotel, an aristocratic resort.

== Activities as journalist and writer ==
By 1999, Alexander von Schönburg was widely known as a member of one of the so-called popular culture quintuplets, with Christian Kracht, Eckhart Nickel, Benjamin von Stuckrad-Barre and Joachim Bessing, associating him with German pop literature. He worked as a freelance journalist and was featured in such publications as Esquire, Die Zeit, the Swiss periodical Die Weltwoche, and Vogue.

He was editor in chief of lifestyle magazine Park Avenue in 2005. In 2006, he left this position, being replaced by Andreas Petzold. He continues to write as a columnist and German correspondent for Vanity Fair and the Bild-Zeitung, among others.

He has authored several books in German, including the 2005 best seller Die Kunst des stilvollen Verarmens ("The Art of Growing Poor Stylishly"), in which he discussed the lessons of dearth after years of decadence. Some of his other book titles read in English are "Encyclopedia of Superfluous Things" and "Everything You Ever Wanted to Know About Kings, But Were Afraid to Ask".

== Dynastic activities ==
In 1995, his older brother, Carl-Alban, married a commoner and formally renounced his rights of dynastic succession. Alexander thereby became the recognized successor to his father's familial headship. Upon the death of their father in 1998, he became head of the comital branch of the formerly sovereign House of Schönburg.

As a member of the comital branch of the House of Schönburg, Alexander is historically entitled to the style of address Illustrious Highness. Although German law ceased recognition of the status or styles of noble houses in 1919, historical titles henceforth became their legal surnames.

== Marriage and children ==
On April 30, 1999, Alexander married Princess Irina of Hesse (b. 1 April 1971, Munich, Bavaria), in a civil ceremony in Berlin. They were married religiously in Heusenstamm, Hesse on May 29, 1999. The new Countess of Schönburg-Glauchau was born Princess Irina, the second child of Prince Karl Adolf Andreas of Hesse (b. 1937, Berlin) and his Hungarian wife, Countess Yvonne Szapáry von Muraszombath, Széchysziget und Szapár (b. 1944, Budapest). Irina's grandparents were Prince Christoph of Hesse and his wife Princess Sophie of Greece and Denmark, elder sister of Prince Philip, Duke of Edinburgh, consort of Elizabeth II. She is a second cousin of Donatus, Landgrave of Hesse.

The couple have three children:

- Countess Maria-Letitia Jolanta (b. 30 July 2001)
- Count Maximus Carolus Joachim Maria (b. 25 May 2003, Berlin)
- Count Valentin Polykarp Josef Maria (b. 23 February 2005, Berlin)

Though descended from Queen Victoria through her granddaughter Princess Margaret of Prussia, Landgravine of Hesse-Kassel, Irina and her children are excluded from succession to the British throne because they are Roman Catholic.

== Notable published works ==
- Das Beste vom Besten. Ein Almanach der feinen Lebensart (mit Reinhard Haas und Axel Thorer). Econ, Düsseldorf 1989, ISBN 978-3-430-13733-1
- No. 1. Die besten Seiten des Lebens von A–Z (mit Reinhard Haas und Axel Thorer). Econ, Düsseldorf ISBN 978-3-612-26037-6
- In Bruckners Reich. Erzählung. In: Christian Kracht (Hrsg.): Mesopotamia. Ernste Geschichten am Ende des Jahrtausends. DVA, Stuttgart 1999, ISBN 978-3-421-05191-2
- Tristesse Royale: Das popkulturelle Quintett mit Joachim Bessing, Christian Kracht, Eckhart Nickel, Alexander v. Schönburg und Benjamin v. Stuckrad-Barre, hrsg. von Joachim Bessing. Ullstein, Berlin 1999, ISBN 978-3-548-31226-2
- Karriere. Theaterstück. Hannover, 2001
- Der fröhliche Nichtraucher. Wie man gut gelaunt mit dem Rauchen aufhört. Rowohlt Taschenbuch, Reinbek 2003, ISBN 978-3-499-61660-0
- Die Kunst des stilvollen Verarmens. Wie man ohne Geld reich wird. Rowohlt Berlin, Berlin 2005, ISBN 978-3-87134-520-3
- Lexikon der überflüssigen Dinge. Rowohlt Berlin, Berlin 2006, ISBN 978-3-87134-543-2
- Alles was Sie schon immer über Könige wissen wollten aber nie zu fragen wagten. Rowohlt Berlin, Berlin 2008, ISBN 978-3-87134-604-0

== Ancestry ==
Ancestors of Alexander, Count of Schönburg-Glauchau

8. Joachim, Count of Schönburg-Glauchau and Waldenburg
4. Carl, Count of Schönburg-Glauchau and Waldenburg
9. Countess Oktavia Chotek of Chotkowa and Wognin
2. Joachim, Count of Schönburg-Glauchau
10. Count Rudolf Baworów-Baworowski
5. Countess Maria Anna Baworów-Baworowska
11. Countess Franziska Anna Chorinsky
1. Alexander, Count of Schönburg-Glauchau
12. Count Ödön Széchényi de Sárvár-Felsövidék
6. Count Valentin Széchényi of Sárvár-Felsővidék
13. Eulalia Christopoulos
3. Countess Beatrix Széchenyi de Sárvár-Felsővidék
14. Prince Paul Pavlovich Galitzine
7. Princess Maria Galitzine
15. Princess Alexandra Nikolajewna Mestscherskaya

== See also ==
- House of Schönburg
- Gloria, Princess of Thurn and Taxis

== Sources ==
- Die Kunst des stilvollen Verarmens Werbetext des Rowohlt Verlags
- Andreas Petzold übernimmt Chefredaktion von Park Avenue Pressemitteilung des Verlagshauses Gruner + Jahr vom 22. August 2006
- Weniger ist mehr Alexander von Schönburg erläutert seine Philosophie in der Welt am Sonntag vom 13. März 2005
