= Hugo Wilson =

English artist and sculptor

- Born: 1982 (age 43–44); London, England
- Education: Charles H. Cecil Studios (2004); City and Guilds of London Art School (2008)
- Occupations: Artist, sculptor
- Spouse: Princess Maria Theresia of Thurn and Taxis (m. 2014)
- Children: 2

Hugo Wilson (born 1982) is an English artist and sculptor.

== Early life ==
Wilson was born in London. He is the son of Kenneth Wilson and Diana Wilson, of Battersea, London. At the age of 17 he went to Florence, Italy to be trained as a painter at the Charles H. Cecil Studios, from 2000 to 2004, and received a Master's degree from the City and Guilds of London Art School in 2008.

== Career ==
Wilson has had solo shows at Parafin, London; Project B, Milan; Mihai Nicodim Gallery, Los Angeles, and numerous group or two person shows.

== Personal life ==
On 13 September 2014, Wilson married Princess Maria Theresia of Thurn and Taxis, daughter of Johannes, 11th Prince of Thurn and Taxis, and Countess Gloria of Schönburg-Glauchau, at St. Joseph's Church in Tutzing, Germany. Their first daughter Mafalda Beatrix Maria was born on 21 August 2015 in London. Their second daughter Maya Romy Alexandra was born on 22 September 2017. He lives and works in London.
