= Christine Esterházy =

German opera singer (born 1959)

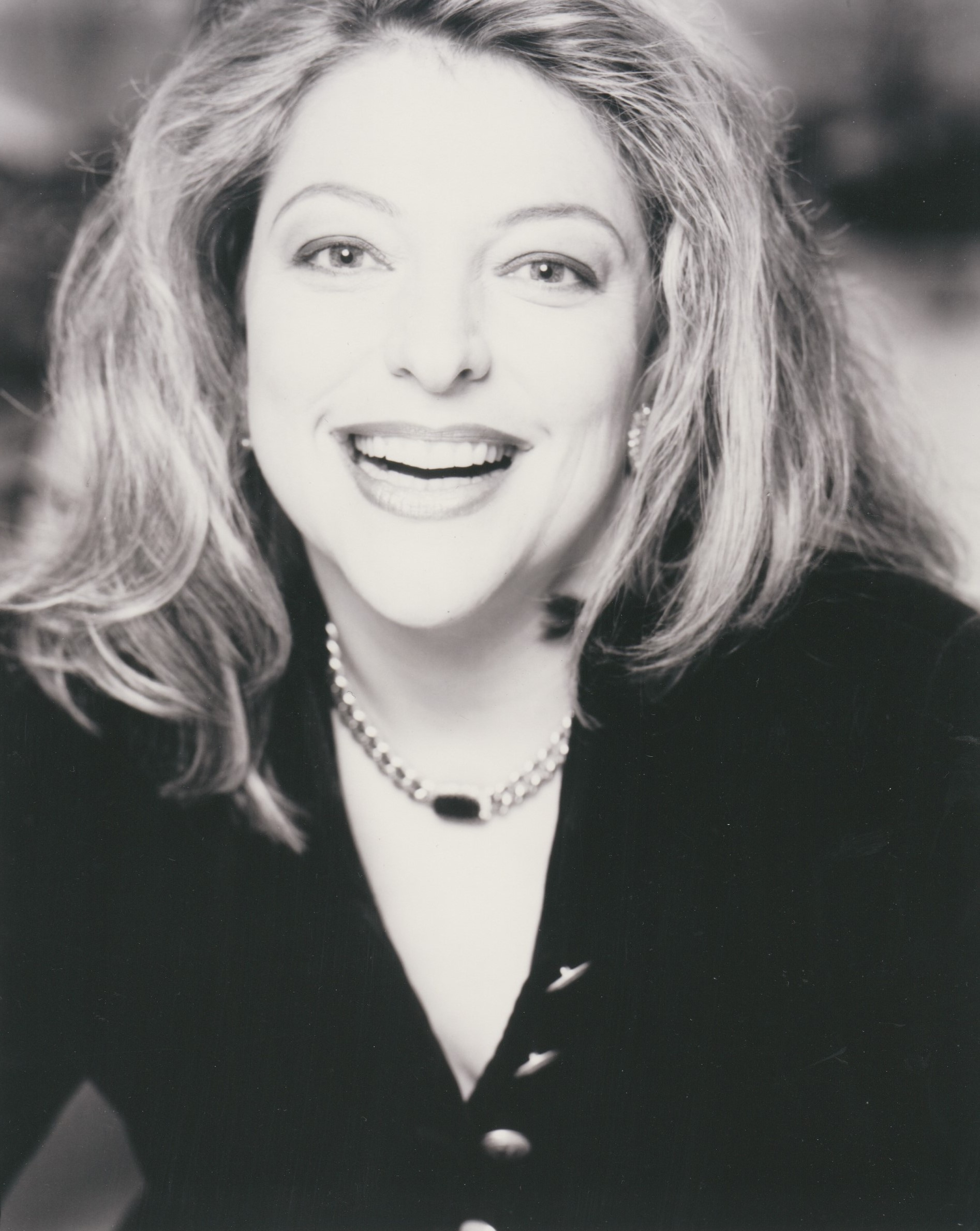
- Born: Christine Obermayr; May 30, 1959 (age 66); Wiesbaden, Hesse, West Germany
- Education: University of Mainz; University of Salzburg
- Occupation: opera singer
- Spouse: Count Endre Esterházy von Galántha
- Relatives: Esterházy family

Countess Christine Esterházy von Galántha (née Obermayr; born 30 May 1959) is a German opera singer and mezzo-soprano. She made her professional debut as Carmen at the Theater Ulm in Baden-Württemberg. Trained by Eduard Wollitz and Josef Metternich, she has performed at the Staatstheater am Gärtnerplatz and the Vienna Volksoper.

== Early life and education ==
Esterházy was born Christine Obermayr on 30 May 1959 in Wiesbaden, Hesse.

She studied musicology and politics at the University of Mainz. She studied classical singing under Eduard Wollitz and Josef Metternich. She received a doctorate from the University of Salzburg in 1999.

== Career ==
She made her professional opera debut at the Theater Ulm when she was twenty-six years old, singing Carmen. In 1983 she performed as Cherubino in Wolfgang Amadeus Mozart's The Marriage of Figaro at the Staatstheater am Gärtnerplatz in Munich. She has also performed at opera houses in Luxembourg, Bayreuth, Paris, Vienna, Berlin, Bonn, Turin, Madrid, Naples, and Barcelona. Esterházy worked with conductors Lorin Maazel, Horst Stein, James Levin, Gustav Kuhn and directors August Everding, Werner Herzog, Götz Friedrich, and Christine Mielitz.

She performed at the funeral mass for Beatrix, Countess of Schönburg-Glauchau in Munich on 6 November 2021.

== Personal life ==
In 1994 she married Count Endre Esterházy von Galántha, a member of the Hungarian nobility.
