= Friedrich Christian Flick Collection =

Modern Art collection

The Friedrich Christian Flick Collection is a modern art collection founded by Friedrich Christian Flick (1944-2026), an art collector and heir to the fortune of the noble Flick industrial family. It is one of the world's leading modern art collections.

== Collection ==
The collection encompasses around 2,500 works by 150 artists. From 2004 to 2010, parts of the collection were on display in Berlin, in the Hamburger Bahnhof museum, as part of a cooperation between Flick, the Prussian Cultural Heritage Foundation and the Berlin State Museums. Friedrich Christian Flick began his art collection in 1975. From the early 1980s on, he principally collected modern art. The opening exhibition "Creation Myths", the first of a series to be curated by museum staff, was named after U.S. installation artist Jason Rhoades's sculpture of the same name. The venture was originally planned for an initial period of seven years, until 2011. The partnership was later extended by another ten years, until 2021.

In February 2008, Flick donated 166 works of art to the National Gallery in Berlin, the largest gift of a private person to the museum since its foundation in the 19th century. This donation includes works of the last forty years, including main works by artists like Marcel Broodthaers, John Cage, David Claerbout, Stan Douglas, Urs Fischer, Martin Kippenberger, Hugo Markl, Bruce Nauman, Raymond Pettibon, Jason Rhoades, and Wolfgang Tillmans.

== Architecture ==
The Hamburger Bahnhof was expanded by the annexation of an adjacent warehouse to create an additional 10,000 square metres (110,000 sq ft) for Flick's artworks.

== Controversies ==
In 2001 Flick hired the Dutch architect Rem Koolhaas to design a museum in Zurich for his collection. But Jewish groups and others criticized Flick for, unlike his siblings, not contributing to a $6 billion compensation fund for slave laborers and their families. He argued that the fund was not meant for individual contributions and instead created his own foundation to fight xenophobia, racism and intolerance. But the protests continued, and he decided to place his collection elsewhere.

Through an agreement with the government, Flick then lent his collection of some 2,500 works to the Hamburger Bahnhof, where it will be shown in exhibitions that are supposed to change every nine months or so. German Chancellor Gerhard Schroeder, in a speech at the opening ceremony, said, "The art has to get the chance to unfold itself. Every single piece has a dignity and aura, which is independent of the collector's family history." Berlin's culture senator, Thomas Flierl, expressed misgivings, saying that by rebuilding his business empire in the 1950s and 1960s, Friedrich Flick personified tolerance of former Nazi moguls. Salomon Korn, vice president of the Central Council of Jews in Germany, wrote an open letter to the Munich newspaper Süddeutsche Zeitung asking, "Will there soon be a 'Göring Collection' in Berlin?", calling the plans "a form of moral whitewashing to turn blood money into a socially acceptable form of art ownership." Satirical posters appeared near the Hamburger Bahnhof, offering "free entry for slave labourers" and accusing Flick of using his art collection to avoid paying taxes.

Several prominent artists, including Gerhard Richter, Hans Haacke, Marcel Odenbach and Thomas Struth, made statements in Germany's national weekly broadsheet "Die Zeit" protesting that Flick's principles were immoral and that it was not appropriate for a private collector to be able to determine the content of a state-funded museum. Others, including photographer Wolfgang Tillmans and painter Luc Tuymans, defended Flick, praised his artistic good taste and pointed out that Berlin on its own lacks the financial means with which to purchase comparable works of art. In response to the debate, the Hamburger Bahnhof produced an in-house newspaper representing different points of view for free distribution to exhibition visitors.
