= Friedrich Christian Flick =

German-Swiss art collector and heir (1944–2026)

Friedrich Christian Flick (19 September 1944 – 20 November 2026), also known as Mick Flick, was a German art collector.

== Life ==
Friedrich Christian Flick was born on 19 September 1944 in Sulzbach-Rosenberg, Germany. Trained as a lawyer, he was one of the heirs to the Flick family industrial fortune, and the founder of the Friedrich Christian Flick Collection.

Flick was the son of Otto-Ernst Flick and grandson of the Nazi sympathiser and supporter Friedrich Flick, the founder of the Flick family industrial conglomerate—who was later convicted of crimes against humanity at the Nuremberg Trials, specifically the Flick Trial.

After studying law in Munich, he obtained a doctorate in law in Hamburg. Since the 1970s, he lived in Gstaad, Switzerland.

Flick was first married to the Spanish model and Andy Warhol's muse Andrea de Portago, daughter of Spanish aristocrat and racing driver Alfonso de Portago.

In 1985, he married Countess Maya von Schönburg-Glauchau, a daughter of Joachim, Count of Schönburg-Glauchau and Countess Beatrix Széchényi, and the older sister of Gloria, Princess of Thurn and Taxis. They had three sons (born 1986, 1988 and 1989) and were divorced in 1993.

Flick died in November 2026, aged 82, in a hospital in Rosenheim. A few days earlier, he had suffered a fall while staying at a health resort.
