= Countess Maya von Schönburg-Glauchau =

German socialite (1958–2019)

Maya von Schönburg-Glauchau
- Full name: German: Maria Felicitas Alexandra Albertina Assunta Anna Fernanda Beatrix Gräfin von Schönburg-Glauchau
- Born: 15 August 1958; West Berlin, West Germany
- Died: 27 January 2019 (aged 60); Munich, Bavaria, Germany
- Buried: Northern Cemetery, Munich
- Noble family: Schönburg-Glauchau
- Spouses: Friedrich Christian Flick (m. 1985; div. 1993)
- Issue: Friedrich-Alexander Flick; Maria-Pilar Flick; Ernst-Moritz Flick; Maria Carlotta Beatrice Hipp
- Father: Joachim, Count of Schönburg-Glauchau
- Mother: Countess Beatrix Széchényi de Sárvár-Felsővidék

Maria Felicitas, Countess von Schönburg-Glauchau (German: Maria Felicitas Alexandra Albertina Assunta Anna Fernanda Beatrix Gräfin von Schönburg-Glauchau; 15 August 1958 – 27 January 2019), also known as Maya von Schönburg, was a German socialite.

== Early life and family ==
Maya, Countess of Schönburg-Glauchau was born on 15 August 1958 to Joachim, Count of Schönburg-Glauchau and his first wife, Countess Beatrix Széchenyi de Sárvár-Felsővidék. Her father was the nominal successor head of the mediatized German comital Schönburg-Glauchau. Her mother is the great-granddaughter of the Hungarian social reformer Count István Széchenyi.

Maya was the sister of Carl-Alban, Alexander, Count of Schönburg-Glauchau, and Gloria, Princess of Thurn and Taxis. She was the half-sister of Anabel from her father's second marriage to Ursula Zwicker.

In the 1960s, Maya von Schönburg-Glauchau's family moved to Togo due to her father's profession as a journalist and foreign correspondent. They later moved to Somalia, where she was educated at an Italian missionary school in Mogadishu. The family returned to Germany in 1970, residing in Meckenheim in the Rhineland. Following the reunification of Germany in 1990, her father reclaimed the family's estates in Saxony which had been taken by the Soviets after World War II.

Maya von Schönburg-Glauchau was the maternal aunt of Maria Theresia, Princess of Thurn and Taxis (born 1980), Elisabeth, Princess of Thurn und Taxis, and Albert, 12th Prince of Thurn and Taxis.

== Personal life ==
In 1985 Countess von Schönburg-Glauchau married Friedrich Christian Flick, founder of the Friedrich Christian Flick Collection and heir to the Flick family fortune. They had three children: Friedrich-Alexander, Maria-Pilar, and Ernst-Moritz. They divorced in 1993. She later had a daughter, Maria Carlotta Beatrice (*2004), with her then-partner Stefan Hipp (b. 1968). The countess lived in Parkside House at Englefield Green, a former residence of Marilyn Monroe, before moving to Italy in 2011. In 2012, she was diagnosed with terminal lung cancer and moved back to Germany to receive treatment.

A Traditionalist Catholic, Countess von Schönburg-Glauchau went on pilgrimages with her sister Princess Gloria to Santiago de Compostela Cathedral and Sanctuary of Our Lady of Lourdes, to which she partially credited with her recovery from cancer. She stated in an interview with Die Welt that at Christmas time her family does not celebrate Santa Claus, instead choosing to celebrate the Christkind.

The countess was in a committed relationship with former Sotheby's chairman Henry Wyndham.

In 2008 Countess von Schönburg-Glauchau voiced her opinion on family life and a woman's role, stating that she believed women are meant to raise children and that mothers should not have careers.

She was frequently photographed at fashion, art, and society events in Germany and in England.

== Legal issues ==
In 2013, Countess Maya von Schönburg-Glauchau faced a tribunal in Reading, Berkshire, for the treatment of her former housekeeper, Teresa Filipowska, whom she had hired in 2008 while living at Parkside House. Filipowska alleged that she was fired for becoming pregnant without her employer's consent, and also claimed that she was overworked and mistreated by the countess. The tribunal ordered the countess to pay Filipowska £19,000 on the grounds of unfair dismissal, sex discrimination, and unpaid wages.

== Death ==
Countess Maya von Schönburg-Glauchau's lung cancer returned. On 27 January 2019 she died from complications relating to cancer while staying at her mother's home in Munich. She was buried in Northern Cemetery in Munich after a Catholic funeral service was held at the Cathedral of Our Lady on 2 February 2019.

== Ancestry ==
Ancestors of Countess Maya von Schönburg-Glauchau

8. Joachim, Count Schönburg-Glauchau
4. Count Karl von Schönburg-Glauchau
9. Countess Oktavia Chotek von Chotkowa und Wognin
2. Joachim, Count of Schönburg-Glauchau
10. Count Rudolf Baworów-Baworowski
5. Countess Maria Anna Baworów-Baworowska
11. Countess Franziska Anna Chorinsky, Baroness von Ledske
1. Countess Maya Von Schönburg-Glauchau
12. Count Edmund Széchényi von Sárvár-Felsővidék
6. Count Balint (Valentin) Széchényi von Sárvár-Felsővidék
13. Eulalia Christopoulos
3. Countess Beatrix Maria Széchényi de Sárvár-Felsővidék
14. Prince Prince Paul Pavlovich Galitzine
7. Princess Maria Pavlovna Golitsyna
15. Princess Alexandra Nikolajewna Meshcherskaya
