= Maria Theresia Thurn und Taxis =

Bavarian visual artist, journalist and landowner

Princess Maria
- Born: 28 November 1980 (age 45); Regensburg, Bavaria, Germany
- Spouse: Hugo Wilson (m. 2014)
- Issue: Mafalda Wilson; Maya Wilson
Names
- German: Maria Theresia Ludowika Klothilde Helene Alexandra Prinzessin von Thurn und Taxis
- House: Thurn and Taxis
- Father: Johannes, 11th Prince of Thurn and Taxis
- Mother: Countess Gloria of Schönburg-Glauchau
- Occupation: artist, journalist, landowner

Princess Maria Theresia of Thurn and Taxis (Maria Theresia Ludowika Klothilde Helene Alexandra Prinzessin von Thurn und Taxis; born 28 November 1980 in Regensburg), is a German visual artist, journalist, forest and agricultural landowner, and member of the German princely House of Thurn und Taxis. Along with her siblings, her family owns one of Europe's largest private estates.

== Early life, family, and education ==
Maria Theresia is the eldest child and daughter of Johannes, 11th Prince of Thurn and Taxis and his wife Gloria, Princess of Thurn and Taxis (née Gräfin von Schönburg-Glauchau). Maria Theresia's family's lands form one of the largest private estates in Europe. After the death of her father in 1990, Maria Theresia was a joint heir, along with her sister Princess Elisabeth and Prince Albert, to one of the largest privately owned forests in Europe, consisting of 36,000 hectares. She and her siblings are the largest private landowners in Germany.

Maria Theresia attended elementary school and secondary school in Regensburg where she lived with her family at Schloss St. Emmeram. To acquire her qualification for university entrance (German: Hochschulreife), Maria Theresia's mother shielded her from the German media by sending her to England to complete her secondary education. From 2002, Maria Theresia studied sociology, psychology, and communications in Madrid. Since 2004, she studied communications and media studies with a focus on film and directing in Paris and London.

== Artistic career ==
Maria Theresia worked as a freelance journalist and visual artist in London after completing school. She shares an artist studio with her husband, and produces art.

== Personal life ==
In 2001, Maria Theresia was granted compensation from the Bauer Media Group (German: Bauer Verlagsgruppe) upon her appeal to the Higher Regional Court of Hamburg (German: Hanseatisches Oberlandesgericht) due to fabricated photograph montages in their Neue Post magazine claiming she was to marry Felipe, Prince of Asturias.

On 13 September 2014, she married Hugo Wilson, a British artist based in London, in a Catholic ceremony at St. Joseph's Church in Tutzing, Germany.

On 29 April 2015, it was announced that Maria Theresia and Hugo Wilson were expecting their first child. On 21 August, Maria Theresia gave birth to a girl, Mafalda Beatrix Mary, in London, England. A second daughter, Maya Romy Alexandra, was born on 22 September 2017.

== Decorations ==
- Dame of Honour and Devotion in Obedience of the Sovereign Military Hospitaller Order of Saint John of Jerusalem, of Rhodes and of Malta (20 June 2009).
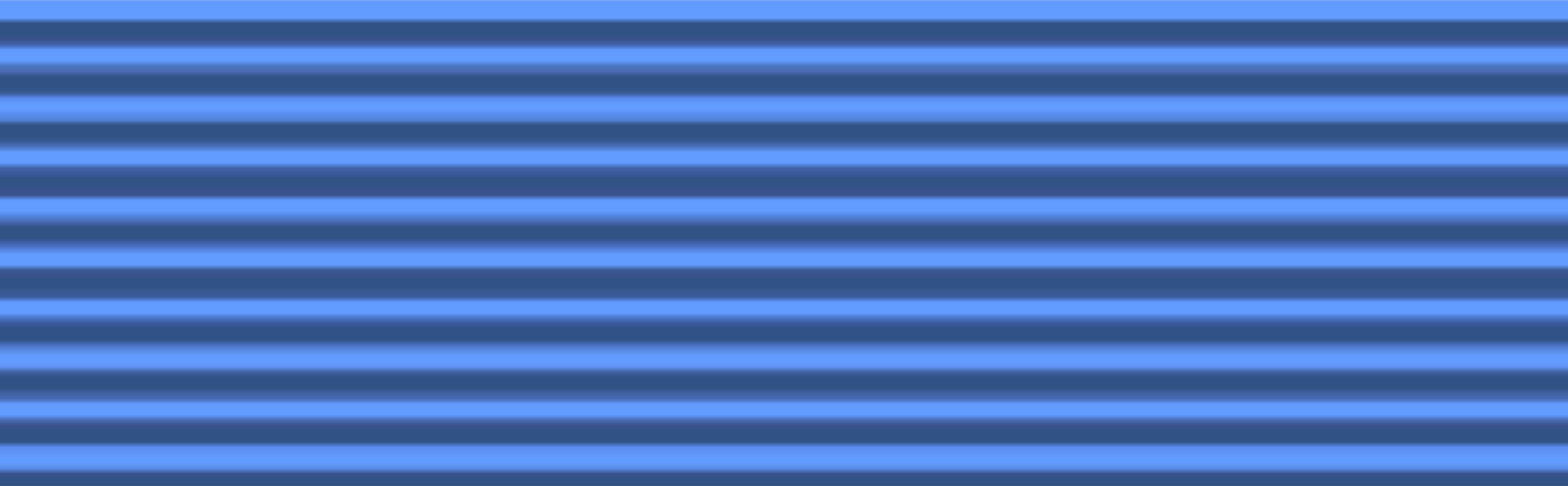
- Dame Grand Cross of the Order of Perfect Friendship.
