= Finch's Quarterly Review =

Finch's Quarterly Review was an international luxury magazine which published articles about glamour and style, often with a humorous slant. The magazine was primarily aimed at the luxury sector, but also included coverage of philanthropy, politics, the arts, history and music. Articles in the publication were often written by society insiders, from a perspective which was often not available in other magazines. The target audience of the magazine was people in show business.

== History ==
The magazine was launched in 2008 by Charles Finch and Nick Foulkes. As of May 2012, it had published 20 issues. The Editor-in-Chief was Nick Foulkes.

In 2012 an essay from the magazine, "Jesus was a Commie", was adapted as a film by Matthew Modine.

Each year the magazine held an event during the Cannes Film Festival called the FQR Filmmakers Dinner at the Hotel du Cap. The dinner was sponsored by IWC and Chopard. Among the guests included were well-known producers and directors.

The magazine included a controversial blog called The Princess Diaries, by Elisabeth von Thurn und Taxis. von Thurn und Taxis wrote about the problems of the wealthy, often contrasting these with the problems of other people.

=== Editorial ===
Contributors to FQR over the years have included Tommy Hilfiger, Sharon Stone, Christian Louboutin, Tony Hall, Kevin Spacey, John Malkovich, Eric Dane, Bryan Ferry, Nic Roeg, Sophia Loren, Charles Saumarez-Smith, Matthew Modine, Michael Chow, Edward Watson, Elle Macpherson, Emma Thompson and Sir Terence Conran.

==== Style and production ====
FQR's look was that of a broadsheet newspaper, in the fashion of Ritz Magazine of the 70's and early 80's. The production design was carried out by Nick Foulkes and Art Director Tristram Fetherstonhaugh. Princess Elisabeth von Thurn und Taxis served as Features Editor, followed by Emilia Hungerford. The magazine's last Managing Editor was Tom Chamberlin, who served from 2010 to 2013. The issues themselves ranged in pagination but were usually kept under 40 pages. Distribution was via subscription.
