= Hamburger Bahnhof =

Contemporary art museum in Germany

Coordinates: 52°31′42″N 13°22′20″E

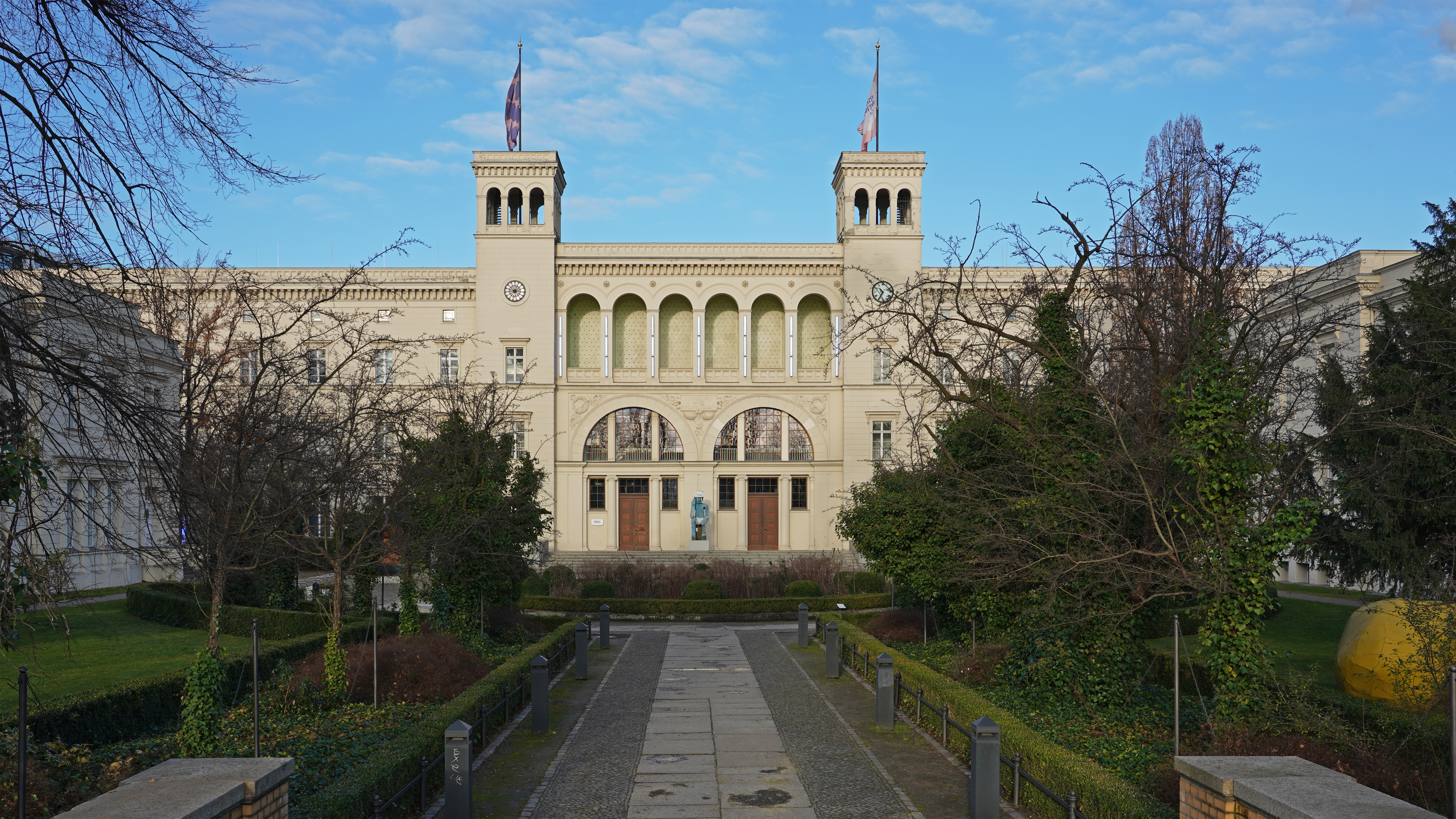
- Established: 1996
- Location: Invalidenstraße 50-51, 10557 Berlin, Germany
- Visitors: 250,000 (2007)
- Directors: Sam Bardaouil, Till Fellrath
- Curator: Britta Schmitz
- Website: Hamburger Bahnhof

Hamburger Bahnhof – Nationalgalerie der Gegenwart is the former terminus of the Berlin–Hamburg Railway in Berlin, Germany, on Invalidenstrasse in the Moabit district opposite the Charité hospital. Today it serves as a contemporary art museum, the Museum für Gegenwart, part of the Berlin National Gallery.

== Original use as a railway station ==
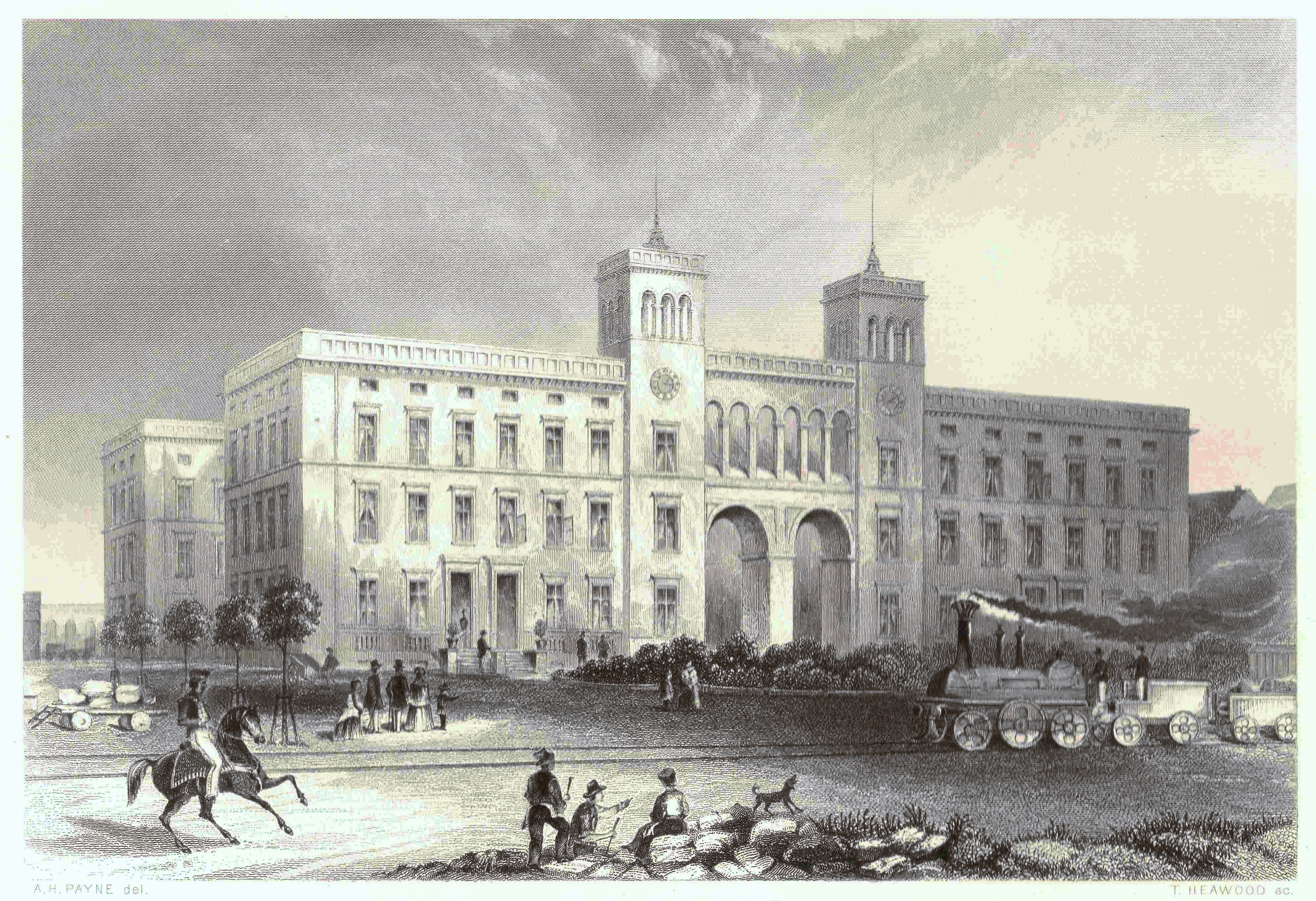
The Hamburger Bahnhof in 1850

The station was built to Friedrich Neuhaus's plans in 1846/47 as the starting point of the Berlin–Hamburg Railway. It is the only surviving terminus building in Berlin from the late neoclassical period and one of the oldest station buildings in Germany.

The building has not been used as a station since 1884, when northbound long-distance trains from Berlin began leaving from Lehrter Bahnhof (now Berlin Hauptbahnhof), just 400 m to the southwest. The original train shed was removed during the 1880s, when the building became an office and apartment complex.

== Use as a railway museum ==
On 14 December 1906, the former station became home to the new Royal Museum of Building and Transport (German: Königliches Bau- und Verkehrsmuseum), supervised by the Prussian State Railways, which was incorporated into the new all-German national railways Deutsche Reichsbahn in 1920. The present "train shed" was constructed on the site of the old one for exhibition purposes, but also to illustrate building techniques. The term 'royal' was dropped with the end of the Prussian monarchy in 1918. The museum attracted crowds and was twice extended with additional wings to the left and right of the main building in 1909–11 and 1914–16. Hit by Allied bombing in 1944, the museum was closed; however, most of the collection survived.

After the war, although located in what had become the British sector of Berlin, the museum remained under the supervision of the East German Reichsbahn, which—by agreement of all the Allies—operated the railways in all of Berlin in addition to East Germany. The Reichsbahn's East German management had no interest in reopening a museum now located in West Berlin, but only in the exhibits, which the Western Allies did not allow to be brought to the East. In 1984 the Reichsbahn transferred both the building and the collection into Western hands. The collection included examples of industrial and technological developments of its time—many locomotives and rolling stock—and was thus a precursor of the Museum of Technology, which now displays many of the exhibits once shown in Hamburger Bahnhof. In 1987, the empty halls were used for temporary exhibitions.

== Rebirth as an art museum ==
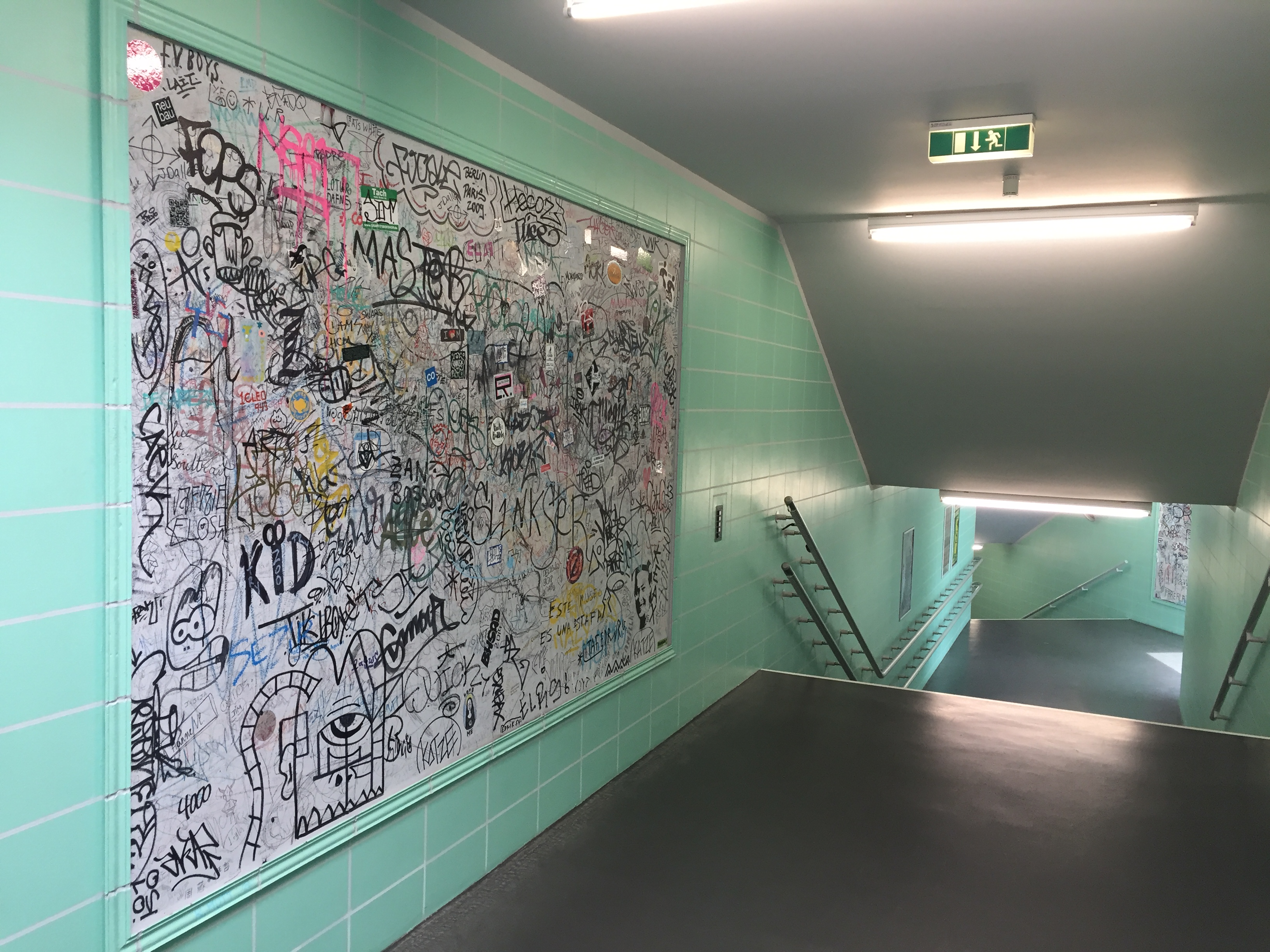
Gateway from Hamburger Bahnhof to Rieckhallen

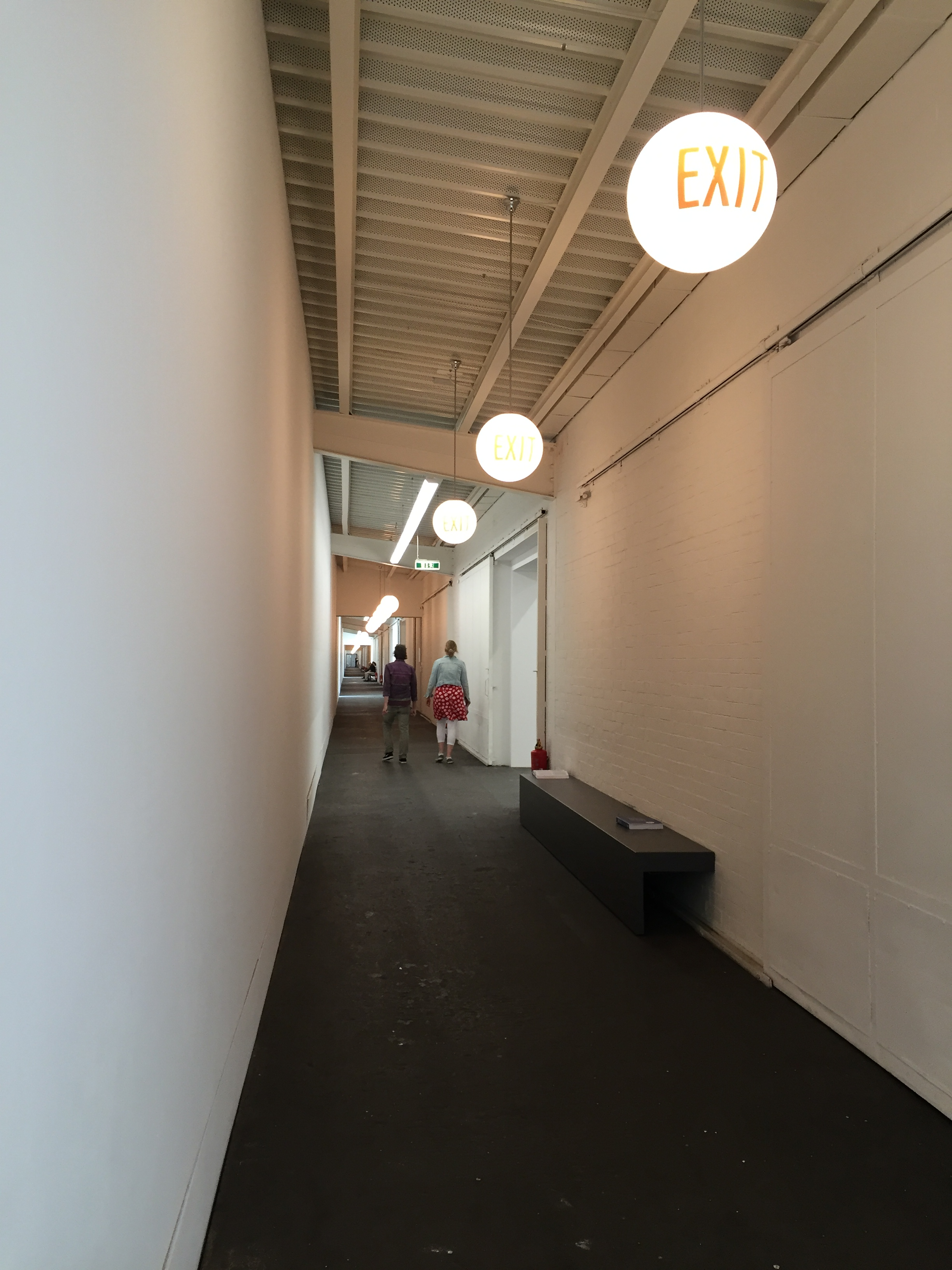
Gateway to Rieckhallen

In the mid-1980s the Berlin entrepreneur Erich Marx offered his private collection of contemporary art to the city. The Berlin Senate decided in 1987 to establish a museum of contemporary art in the former railway station. The Prussian Cultural Heritage Foundation agreed to operate the museum as part of the National Gallery. A competition for the renovation of the station was announced by the Senate in 1989, and was won by the architect Josef Paul Kleihues.

Between 1990 and 1996, Kleihues refurbished the building, and in November 1996 the 108,000 sq ft (10,000 m^{2}) museum was opened with an exhibition of works by Sigmar Polke. The Museum für Gegenwart exhibits modern and contemporary art. Permanent loans from the Marx collection, including works by artists such as Joseph Beuys, Anselm Kiefer, Robert Rauschenberg, Cy Twombly and Andy Warhol, are on permanent display. An emphasis of the Nationalgalerie collection is art on video and film, including a collection of 1970s video art—a gift of Mike Steiner—and the Joseph Beuys media archives. Since the museum opened in 1996, Dan Flavin's Untitled (1996) has been illuminating the building's windows and stone façade in neon green and yellow lights.

=== Rieckhallen ===
In 2004, another part of the building complex, the former Güterbahnhof, which is connected to the Hamburger Bahnhof, was rebuilt as an exhibition hall, the Rieckhallen, for the Friedrich Christian Flick Collection. Between 2004 and 2010, the Museum für Gegenwart exhibited parts of the Friedrich Christian Flick Collection, whose main focus is on the late 20th century. The collection contains large-format works by Paul McCarthy, Jason Rhoades, Rodney Graham, Peter Fischli and David Weiss, and Stan Douglas, including elaborate installations and complex filmic spaces. Due to its connection with the Flick family, the display (which had been rejected by the city of Zurich) gave rise to protests in 2004. Flick nonetheless agreed to lend 1,500 works to the Berlin State Museums, initially for seven years. The first show included about 400 works. Flick then extended the loan for another ten years to 2021. He also invested 8 million euros into having architects Kuehn Malvezzi renovate the Rieckhallen, the former depot of the German Imperial Railway, to showcase his works.

In 2020, the museum building's owner – Austrian property company CA Immo – announced plans to demolish the Rieckhallen after the rental contract expires in September 2021. The planned demolition prompted Flick to end the loan of his collection. Shortly after, the Federal Agency for Real Estate (BIMA) entered into negotiations to buy the Hamburger Bahnhof. By November 2022, the federal government paid €66 million ($68 million) for the Hamburger Bahnhof and the state of Berlin bought the Rieckhallen for around €100 million ($103 million) via a combination of funds and a land swap.

=== Directors ===
- 2001–2016: Eugen Blume
- 2016–2021: Gabriele Knapstein
- 2022–present: Sam Bardaouil and Till Fellrath

== See also ==
- Berlin State Museums
- Prussian Cultural Heritage Foundation
- List of museums and galleries in Berlin
- List of largest art museums
- Musée d'Orsay
