= Hegykő =

- Coat of arms

- Location of Győr-Moson-Sopron county in Hungary

- Location of Hegykő
- Coordinates: 47.61935°N 16.79411°E
- Country: Hungary
- County: Győr-Moson-Sopron

Area
  - Total: 26.84 km^{2} (10.36 sq mi)

Population (2025)
  - Total: 1,686
  - Density: 49.93/km^{2} (129.3/sq mi)
- Time zone: UTC+1 (CET)
  - Summer (DST): UTC+2 (CEST)
- Postal code: 9437
- Area code: 99

Hegykő is a village in Győr-Moson-Sopron county, Hungary.

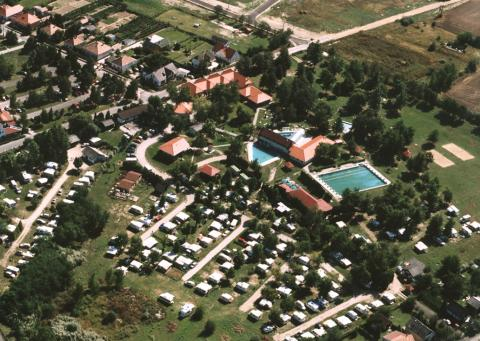
Hegykő from a bird's eye view

== Notable people ==
- Beatrix, Countess of Schönburg-Glauchau (1930–2021), born in Hegykő
