= Rochsburg Castle =

Coordinates: 50°56′36.71″N 12°45′52.43″E

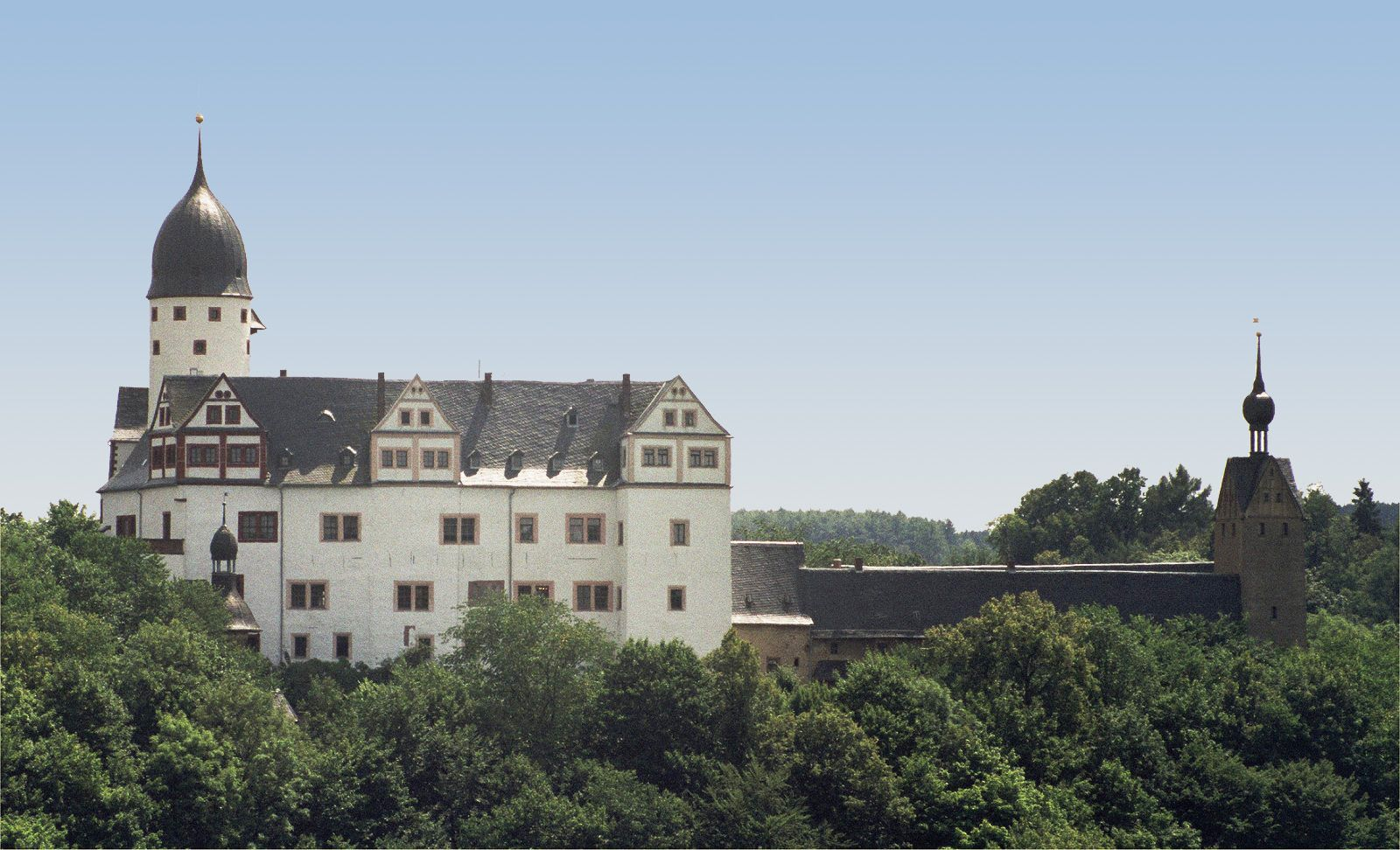
Schloss Rochsburg

Rochsburg Castle (German: Schloss Rochsburg), which was probably built in the late 12th century, stands on a rock spur, surrounded on three sides by the Zwickau Mulde river, above the eponymous town quarter in Lunzenau in Saxony. The medieval site and its division into the inner bailey, outer bailey and two zwingers is still easy to recognise. In its present appearance the schloss dates, however, to the Late Gothic and Renaissance periods. Its main construction phases date to 1470 and 1548; it is an important example of Renaissance architecture in Saxony. Over centuries the Rochsburg has formed the centrepiece in the Saxon district of Rochsburg.

== History ==
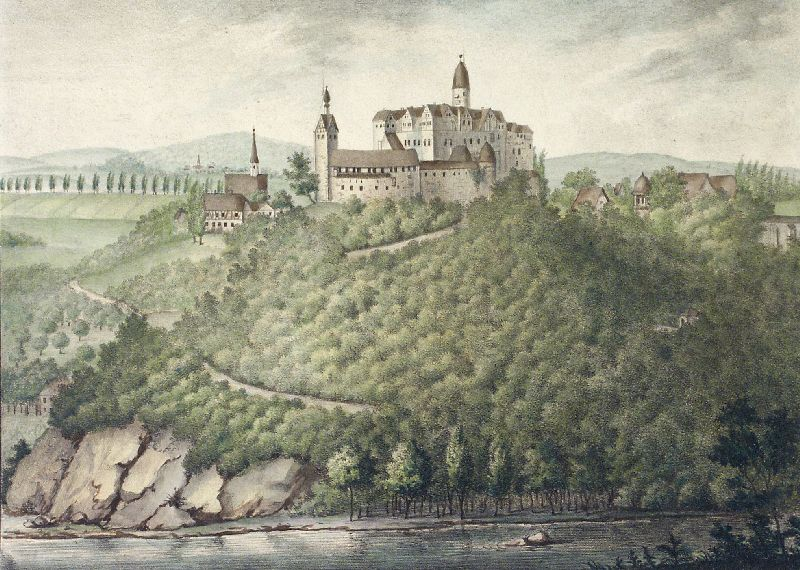
Schloss Rochsburg around 1830

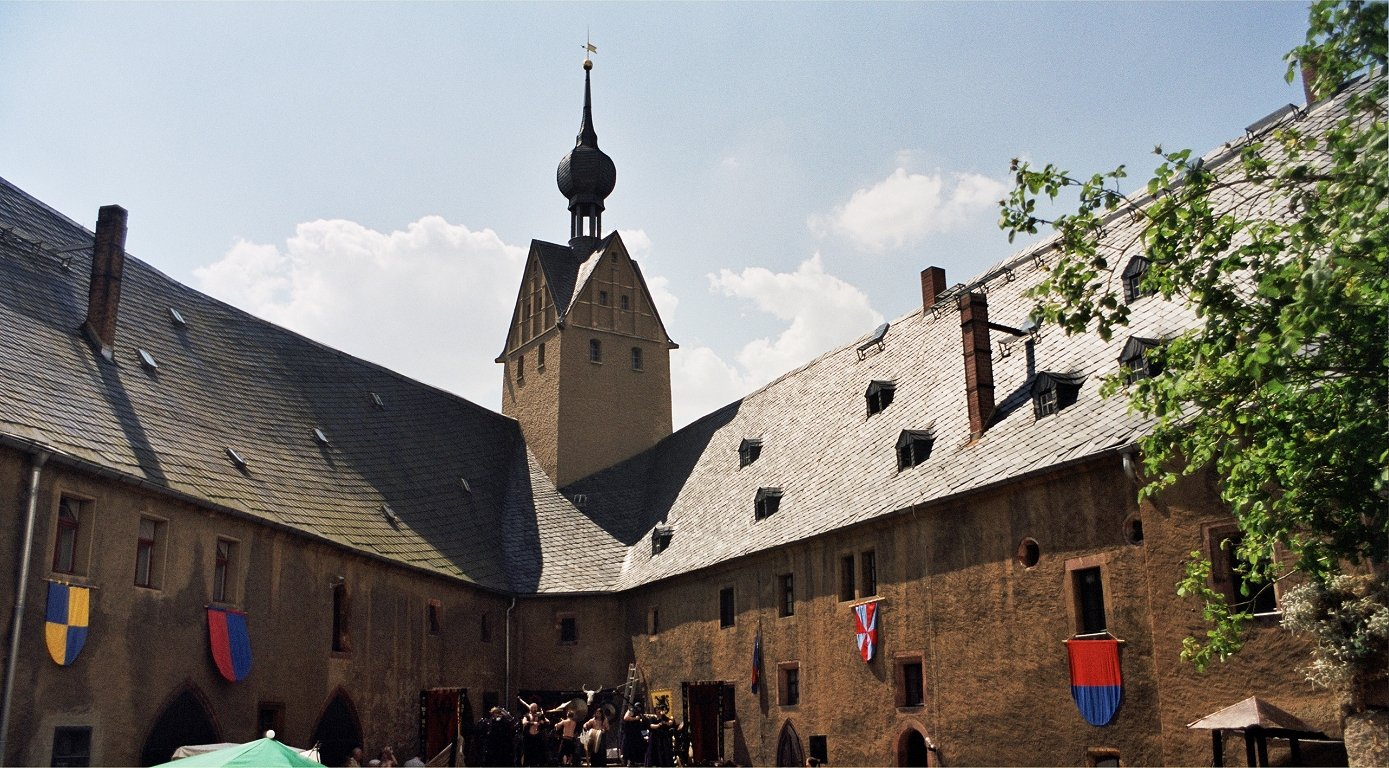
Outer ward

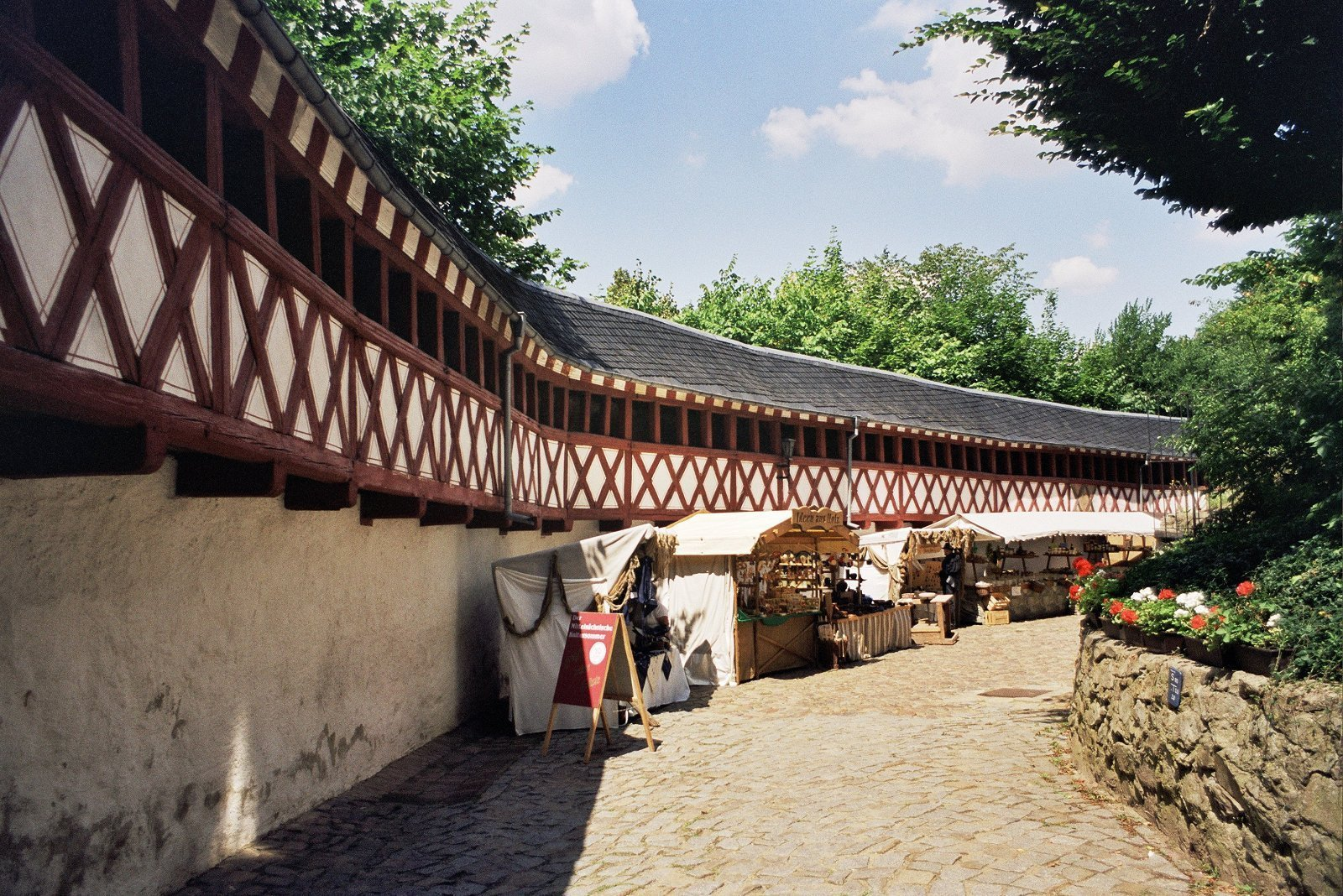
Wall walk

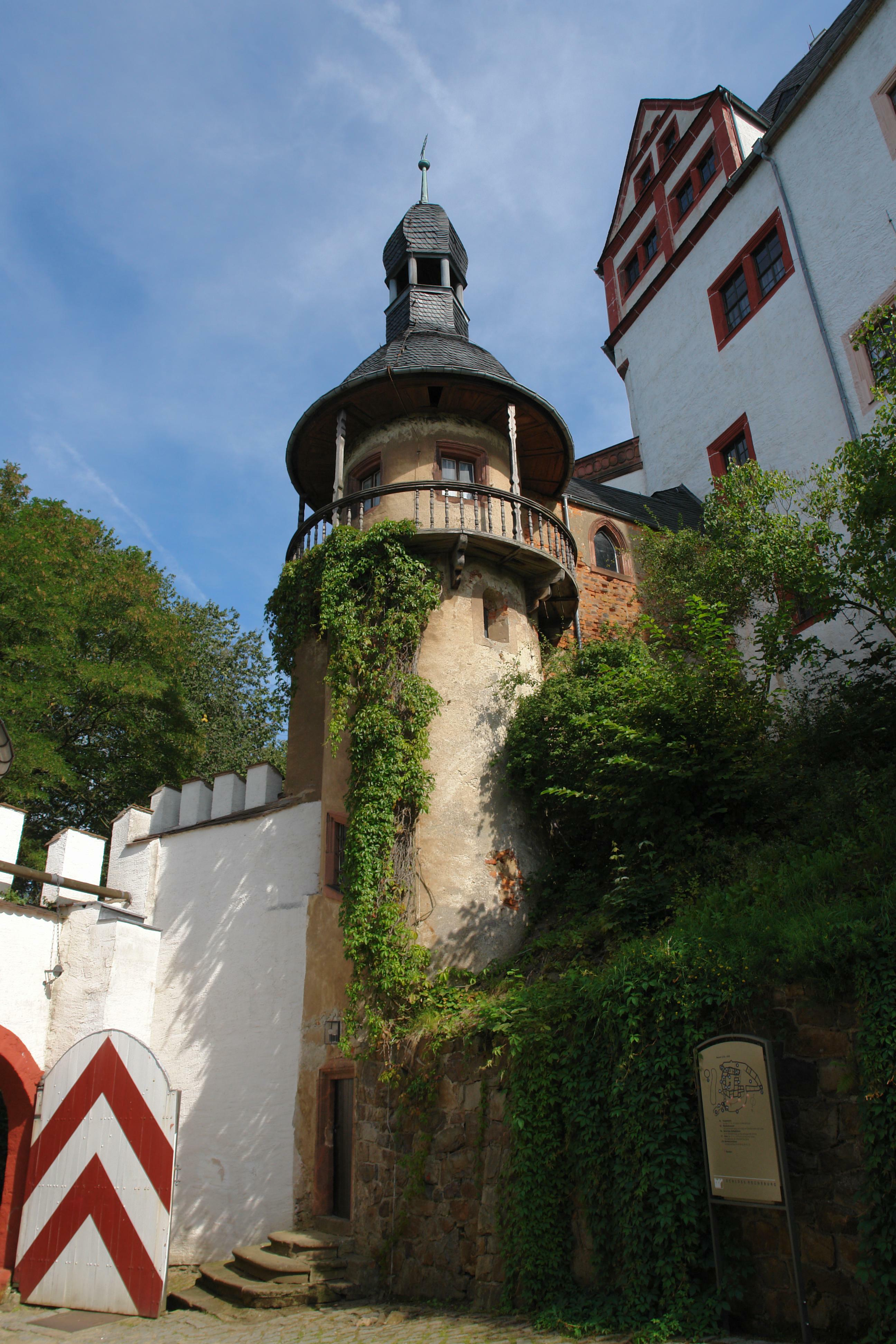
Entrance

Although a certain Gunteros de Rochsberg was mentioned several times from the 1190s, it is not certain whether the castle itself was built before 1200. Gunteros was first mentioned in 1195 in a Wettin document. The name of the Barony of Rochsburg appears several times in the records of the early 13th century.

In 1283, there is the first record of the burgraves of Altenburg as the vassals of the Wettins at Rochsburg. In 1296, the "castrum Burggravii Rochsberg" is named as the apparently preferred residence of Dietrich II of Altenburg.

In 1329, the castle went, through marriage, to Otto of Leisnig, whose descendant, Albert II, ran into financial difficulties and sold the Barony of Rochsburg on 10 March 1448 to Henry, Lord of Gera. The lords of Gera enfeoffed their newly acquired territory four years later to Zschaslaw of Schönfeld for 1500 Schock Freiberg groschen over a period of five years. Because he did not get his money back, Rochsburg became a Wettin amt and Zschaslaw of Schönfeld its Amtmann. On 28 October 1467 the Count of Hohnstein seized the Rochsburg in a coup de main operation. What motivated him to do so has not been established. For two years he remained there undisturbed before, in 1469, Electoral Saxon troops used the absence of the count to recapture it.

The castle went in 1470 for 4,000 guilders as a fief to the politically, influential, electoral advisor and Oberhofmarschall, Hugold IV of Schleinitz (1435–1490), who began in 1470 to undertake comprehensive building work to convert the castle into a schloss, work that lasted 12 years. This work was entrusted to senior state architect, Arnold of Westphalia, one of the most important architects of his time in Central Europe. But Hugold IV of Schleinitz was unable to enjoy the Rochsburg for long. After lengthy negotiations with the state court, a decision was issued in 1488, that he had to return the castle to Duke Albert of Saxony, repay the 4,000 guilders deposit and pay another 4,000 guilders as compensation for the cost of construction.

Reeves once again managed the now ducal (Albertine) amt of Rochsburg. In 1503 the Rochsburg was entirely burned down, carelessness in the kitchen being the cause. The brothers, Henry and Götz of Ende, on the adjacent Kriebstein took advantage of the opportunity and exchanged their Barony of Kriebstein for the Rochsburg territory.

In 1547, when Electoral Saxon troops plundered and razed the weakly defended castle during the Schmalkaldic War, Henry's son, Wolf of Ende, sold the castle and Barony of Rochsburg for 60,000 guilders to the three lords, George, Hugo and Wolf II of Schönburg, who were thus able to further expand their considerable estates in the upper valley of the Zwickau Mulde. They not only rebuilt the ruined site a year later, but with its dormers and windows, gave it the appearance that it still has today. Even the damage by a subsequent fire in 1582, was quickly repaired by the Schönburgs; at that time almost all wooden ceilings were replaced in the form that is still visible today. In 1574 a two-storey maison de plaisance was built in front of the castle gates to a round plan. Today it is the last surviving example of this type of building in Saxony.

In 1637 Christian Ernest of Schönburg became the only owner of the Rochsburg by buying out the others. He left his mark in the layout of the castle gardens.

Increasing financial difficulties forced the owner in 1911 to open up several rooms in the castle to the public as a small museum. In addition, an initially, purely Roman Catholic youth hostel was opened in the buildings.

Until 1945, the Rochsburg remained in the possession of the House of Schönburg who had been elevated to counts in 1700. In 1945, the aristocratic family was dispossessed and the property was seized by the state of Saxony. Three years after the end of the Second World War, the museum was reopened with a larger floor area and has since displayed furnishings from the 16th to 19th centuries. The youth hostel also reopened that year.

In 1952 the then county of Rochlitz took over the Rochsburg. In 1992, Rochlitz was absorbed into the county of Mittweida, who continued to use the property.

From 1991 to 1997, Joachim Graf von Schönburg-Glauchau lived at the Rochsburg. The youth hostel closed in 1998. The museum is currently being expanded.

== Description ==
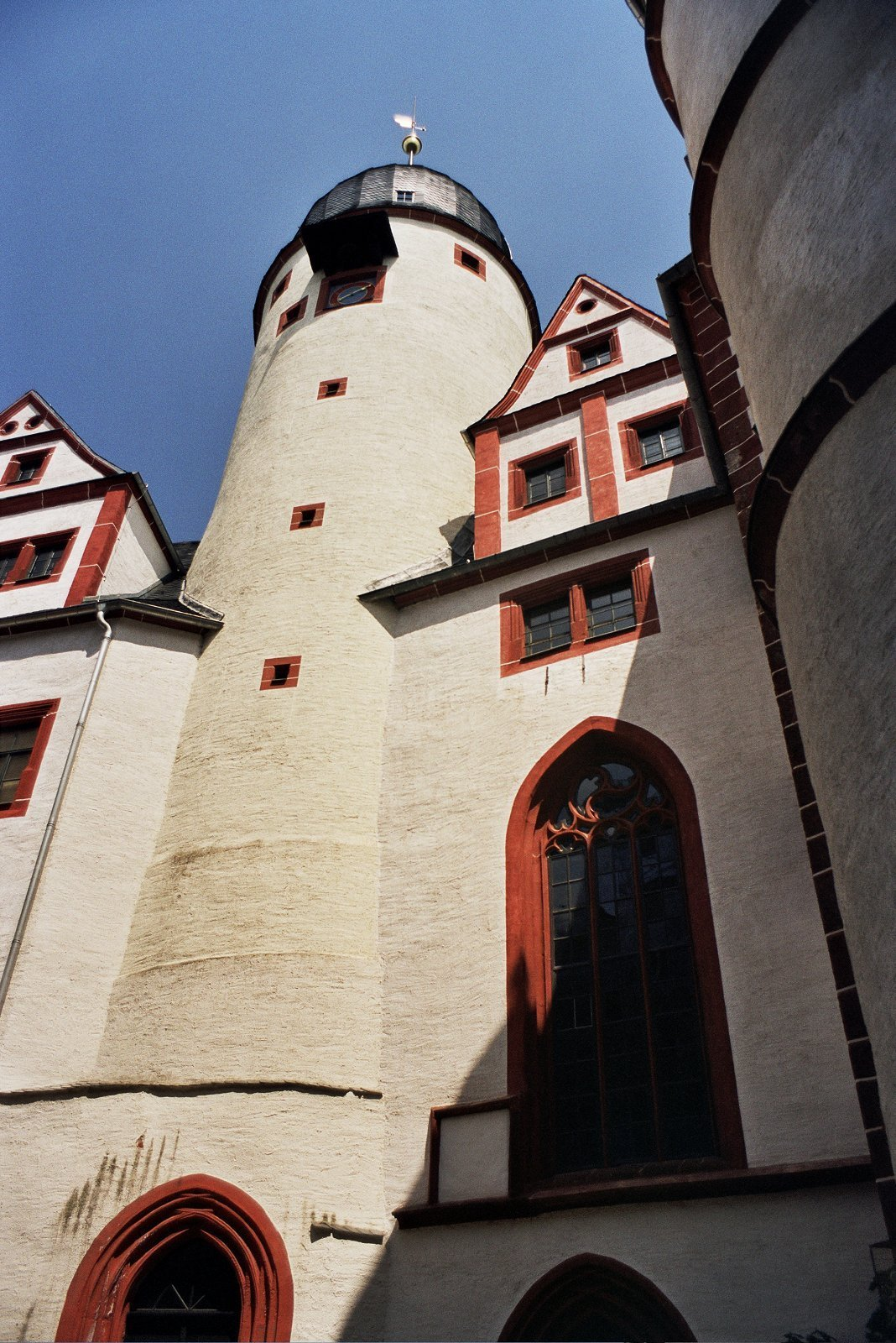
The bergfried

The castle consists of a quadrangular inner ward with the remains of a Late Romanesque hall or residence and the bergfried in the centre, which is partly made of brick and was built in 1200 and the early 13th century. There is also an adjoining domestic courtyard with a triangular ground plan. The Zwickau Mulde flows around the position on three sides and the Rochsburg is well protected by natural features and is only accessible over the drawbridge that spans the neck ditch.

In the inner courtyard of the inner bailey there is a 53-metre-deep castle well within a wooden wellhouse.

The castle chapel of St. Anne in the south wing of the castle has several architecturally notable features. Its recently restored ribbed vaulting was probably made by Caspar Kraft in 1523. Its altar, made of sandstone, was finished in 1576 in the Late Renaissance style by castle architect and sculptor, Andreas Lorenz.

== Literature ==
- Walter Bachmann: Die Rochsburg. In: Mitteilungen des Landesverein Sächsischer Heimatschutz, Vol. XVII, Issue 5-6/1928, Dresden, 1928, pp. 221–246.
- Matthias Donath (ed.): Schloß und Herrschaft Rochsburg. Beucha, 2006, ISBN 3-934544-92-4.
- Yves Hoffmann: Zur Datierung von Wohntürmen und Bergfrieden des 11. bis 13. Jahrhundert auf sächsischen Burgen. In: Historische Bauforschung in Sachsen. Arbeitsheft 4 des Landesamtes für Denkmalpflege 2000. pp. 47–58.
- Karl-Heinz Karsch: Rochsburg. 1st edn., Schnell & Steiner, Regensburg, 1996, ISBN 978-3-7954-6006-8.
