= Flick family =

German industrial family

The Flick family is a wealthy German family with an industrial empire that formerly embraced holdings in companies involved in coal, steel and a minority holding in Daimler AG.

Friedrich Flick (1883–1972) was the founder of the dynasty, establishing a major industrial conglomerate during the Weimar Republic; he was found guilty at the Flick Trial, which formed part of the Nuremberg Trials. During the Second World War Flick's industrial enterprises used 48,000 forced labourers from Germany's concentration camps. Flick was pardoned 3 years later and received a full refund of the proceeds of crime paid, from the governments.

Friedrich Christian Flick, known as Mick Flick, is an art collector and grandson of Friedrich Flick.

== History ==
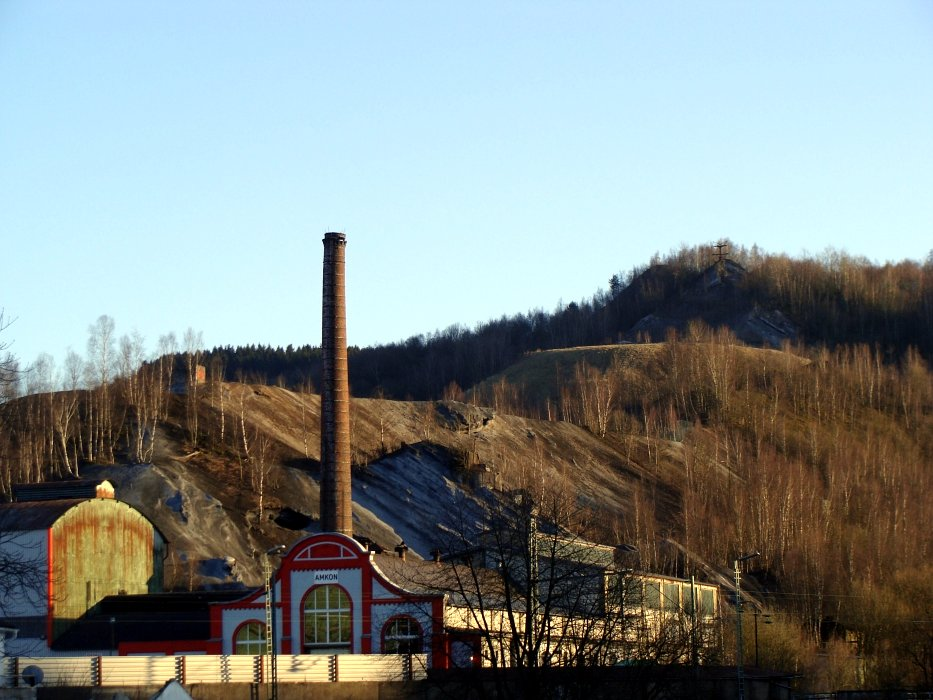
Charlottenhütte

Friedrich Flick was the son of a wealthy farmer, who also owned some stock in a mining company in Ernsdorf. His rise began as a member of the board of directors of the Charlottenhütte mining company, and he eventually became a co-owner. He became the company's Director-General in 1919. During the Weimar Republic, he built an enormous industrial conglomerate.

=== War crimes ===
While originally a member of the right-wing liberal-nationalist German People's Party, Flick also supported the Nazi Party financially from 1933, and over the next ten years donated over seven million marks to the party.

During the Second World War Flick's industrial enterprises used 48,000 forced labourers from Germany's concentration camps. It is estimated that 80 per cent of these workers died as a result of the way they were treated during the war. Flick was found guilty of war crimes at Nuremberg in 1947 and was sentenced to seven years in prison, but was pardoned 3 years after and resumed control over his industrial conglomerate, becoming the richest person in West Germany.

=== Controversies ===
The 1983 Flick Affair revealed that German politicians had been bribed to allow the Flick family to reduce its tax liabilities, and after becoming an Austrian citizen to further reduce his tax obligations, in 1985 Friedrich Karl Flick sold most of his industrial holdings to Deutsche Bank for $2.5 billion (£1.4 billion), retiring until his 2006 death.

On Thursday November 20, 2008, it was reported that his body was stolen from a cemetery in Velden am Wörtersee, Austria.

=== Charitable donations ===
A German high school in Flick's hometown was called the "Friedrich-Flick-Gymnasium" until September 2008. The contribution from Flick had made it possible to build this school in 1969. The Donatella Flick Conducting Competition is named for Princess Donatella Missikoff Flick, the wife of Gert Rudolph Flick.

== Notable members ==
- Friedrich Flick (10 July 1883 – 20 July 1972), industrialist

=== Children of Friedrich Flick ===
- Otto-Ernst Flick (1916–74), his children (with Barbara Raabe):
  - Dagmar, Countess Vitzthum von Eckstaedt by marriage, now Ottmann. Received the 8000th doctorate from the University of Amsterdam in 1988 with her dissertation on the work of Ludwig Tieck.
  - Gert Rudolph Flick "Muck Flick" (May 29, 1943), 2 children (married and divorced to Princess Johanna von Sayn-Wittgenstein-Hohenstein, married and divorced to Princess Donatella Missikoff of Ossetia with whom he had one son Sebastian (1989), married to Corinne Müller-Vivil with whom he had one daughter)
  - Friedrich Christian Flick "Mick Flick" (September 19, 1944), 3 children with his ex-wife, Maya, Countess von Schönburg-Glauchau:
    - Friedrich-Alexander (March 9, 1986)
    - Maria-Pilar (August 2, 1988)
    - Ernst-Moritz (August 27, 1989)
- Rudolf Flick (born 1919, German Army officer, died June 28, 1941, in Ukraine)
- Friedrich Karl Flick (February 3, 1927 – October 5, 2006), industrialist, involved in a German political scandal; married three times (no children with first wife):
  - Alexandra (with Ursula Kloiber, née Reuther), who wed Stefan Butz
  - Elisabeth Anna (December 24, 1973) (with Ursula Kloiber, née Reuther), who wed February 8, 2006 Prince Wilhelm von Auersperg-Breunner (April 23, 1968); they have two sons and one daughter
  - Victoria-Katharina (January 17, 1999) (with Ingrid Ragger)
  - Karl-Friedrich (January 17, 1999) (with Ingrid Ragger)

Other Flick family members:

- Donatella Flick, born Princess Donatella Missikoff of Ossetia, socialite and philanthropist, former wife of Gert Rudolph Flick.
- Maria (Maya) Felicitas Flick, born Gräfin (Countess) von Schönburg-Glauchau August 15, 1958, daughter of the late politician and author, Joachim, Count von Schönburg-Glauchau, and sister of socialite Gloria, Princess of Thurn and Taxis, Carl Alban, Count of Schönburg-Glauchau (real estate Investment advisor) and of the author Count of Schönburg-Glauchau. She married Friedrich Christian Flick in Munich on August 29, 1985, has three children with him, and the couple were divorced in London on July 15, 1993. She lived in Surrey, England, and died in 2019. She attracted controversy in a 2013 court case alleging unfair treatment of her former housekeeper.
