= Gloria von Thurn und Taxis =

German noblewoman (born 1960)

Gloria
- Dowager Princess of Thurn and Taxis
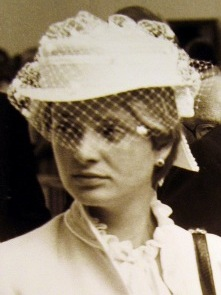
- Gloria in 1981
- Born: Mariae Gloria Ferdinanda Joachima Josephine Wilhelmine Huberta Gräfin von Schönburg-Glauchau; 23 February 1960 (age 66); Stuttgart, West Germany
- Spouse: Johannes, 11th Prince of Thurn and Taxis (m. 1980; died 1990)
- Issue: Princess Maria Theresia; Princess Elisabeth; Albert, 12th Prince of Thurn and Taxis
Names
- Mariae Gloria Ferdinanda Joachima Josephine Wilhelmine Huberta Prinzessin von Thurn und Taxis
- House: Schönburg-Glauchau
- Father: Joachim, Count von Schönburg-Glauchau
- Mother: Countess Beatrix Széchenyi de Sárvár-Felsővidék
- Religion: Catholic
- Occupation: Activist; artist; art collector; businesswoman; socialite

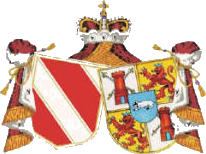
Arms of alliance of Schönburg-Glauchau and Thurn und Taxis families

Mariae Gloria Fürstin von Thurn und Taxis (officially Mariae Gloria Ferdinanda Joachima Josephine Wilhelmine Huberta Prinzessin von Thurn und Taxis; born Gräfin von Schönburg-Glauchau, 23 February 1960), is a German socialite, businesswoman, art collector, artist, and traditionalist Catholic activist. In the 1980s, Gloria was a member of the European jet-set, known as "Princess TNT" for her extravagant, punk-inspired style. After the 1990 death of her husband, Johannes von Thurn und Taxis, she took on the management of Schloss St. Emmeram and the enterprises of the House of Thurn and Taxis, and became a leading patron of the European traditionalist Catholic movement.

== Early life and family ==
Gloria Gräfin von Schönburg-Glauchau was born on 23 February 1960 in Stuttgart, Baden-Württemberg, West Germany. Her father, Joachim, Count of Schönburg-Glauchau, was the nominal head of the Glauchau branch of the German princely House of Schönburg, a mediatised dynasty within the former Holy Roman Empire. Her mother, Countess Beatrix Széchenyi de Sárvár-Felsővidék, was a member of the Széchenyi family and a descendant of Count István Széchenyi.

Her parents divorced in 1986 and her father married Ursula Zwicker. Gloria is one of five children from her father's two marriages. She has two brothers, Carl-Alban Count von Schönburg-Glauchau (born 1966), formerly head of the family, who renounced his rights after his marriage to Juliet Helene Beechy-Fowler, daughter of Nicholas Beechy-Fowler and Countess Jutta von Pfeil und Klein-Ellguth; and Alexander, Count of Schönburg-Glauchau, a writer and the nominal head of the Schönburg-Glauchau branch of the family, who is married according to the rules of the house to Princess Irina of Hesse, grandniece of Prince Philip, Duke of Edinburgh, consort of Queen Elizabeth II. One of her sisters was the socialite Countess Maya von Schönburg-Glauchau. Gloria was baptized as an infant and raised in the Catholic faith.

== Childhood and adolescence ==
When she was a child, Gloria and her family moved to Africa, living in Togo and Somalia, where her father worked as an author and a journalist. Although they are descendants of German nobility, her family had little wealth as a result of communism in Germany and Hungary.

In 1945 the Soviet government of Saxony seized her family's ancestral homes, castles Wechselburg, Hinterglauchau, Forderglauchau, Rochsburg, Alt-Penig, and Neu-Penig. She moved back to West Germany with her family in 1970 and enrolled at the Konrad-Adenauer-Gymnasium in Meckenheim, later studying at Kloster Wald, a girls' boarding school in a Benedictine convent. As a teenager she worked as a waitress at a ski resort in St Moritz, Switzerland.

== Marriage and issue ==
In 1979, at age 19, Gloria met Johannes, Hereditary Prince of Thurn and Taxis, age 53, at a luncheon he hosted at Nürnberger Bratwurst Glöckl in Munich. She began a relationship with him soon thereafter and they married on 31 May 1980 in a Catholic ceremony in Regensburg, Bavaria. At the time of their marriage Johannes was estimated to be worth between $2 and $3 billion. Gloria and her husband are fourth cousins twice removed, both descendants of Karl Alexander, 5th Prince of Thurn and Taxis. Upon their marriage Gloria became the Hereditary Princess of Thurn and Taxis. When her father-in-law, Karl August, 10th Prince of Thurn and Taxis, died in 1982, her husband became the 11th Prince of Thurn and Taxis.

The couple had three children:

- Princess Maria Theresia Ludowika Klothilde Helene Alexandra, born 28 November 1980 in Regensburg. On 13 September 2014, she married Hugo Wilson, a British artist, in Tutzing, Germany. They have two daughters.
- Princess Elisabeth Margarete Maria Anna Beatrix, born 24 March 1982 in Regensburg.
- Prince Albert Maria Lamoral Miguel Johannes Gabriel, born 24 June 1983 in Regensburg, who succeeded his father in 1990 as both principal heir at law and nominal head of the former German princely House of Thurn und Taxis according to the traditional rules of the legal affairs committee of the Association of German Nobility.

== Later life ==
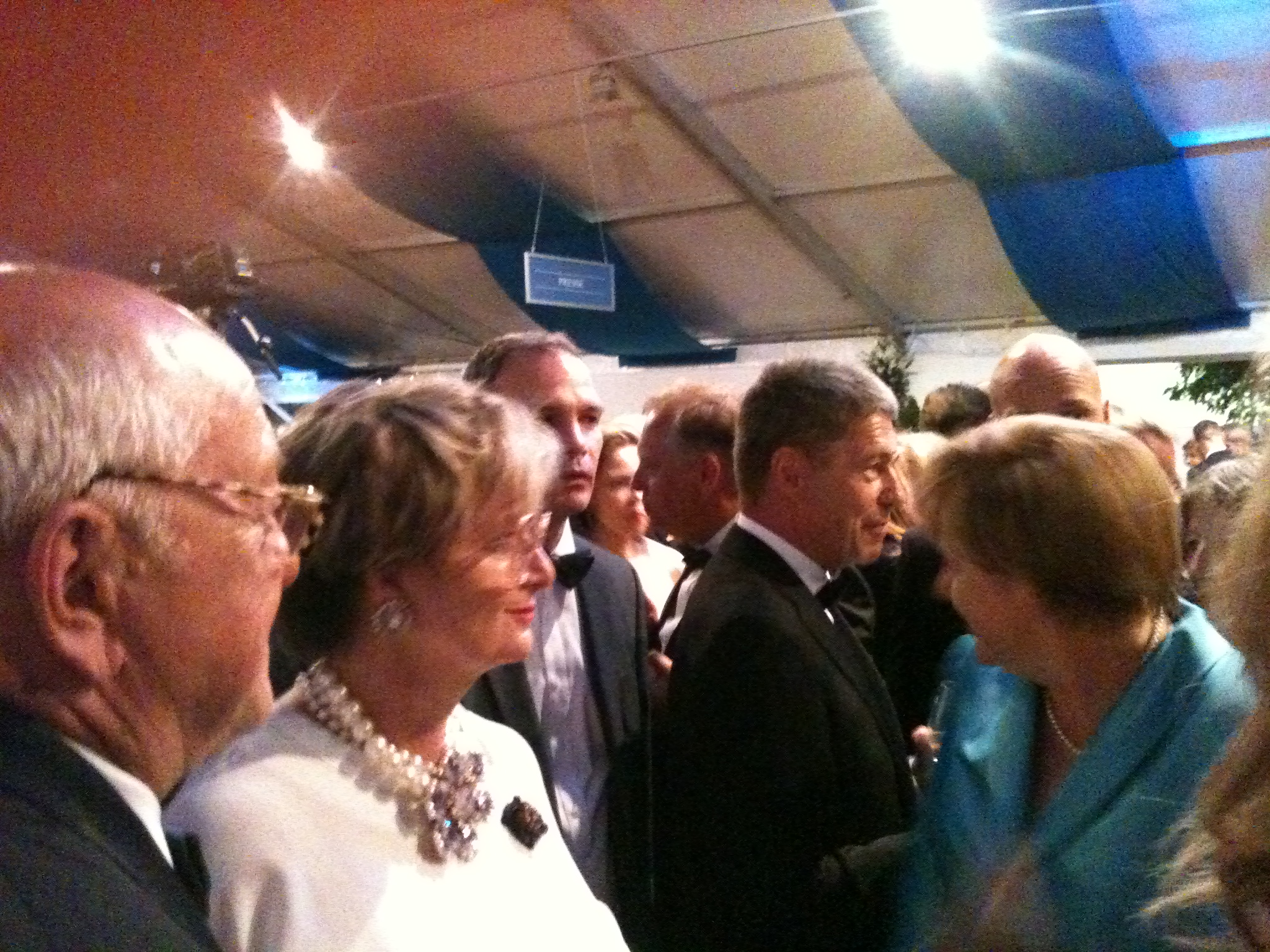
Princess Gloria with German Chancellor Angela Merkel in 2015

Gloria and her husband were known for their lavish lifestyle, becoming social and fashion icons in the 1980s. She became part of the European jet set and was referred to in the media as the "punk princess" and "Princess TNT".

When her husband died in 1990, Gloria was left to settle his debts, which totaled $500 million. Her son, Albert, became the 12th Prince of Thurn and Taxis upon Johannes's death. She acted as the trustee for Albert, taking over management of the family estate, Saint Emmeram's Abbey.

In 2001, Gloria sparked significant outrage after she claimed that AIDS is widespread in Africa because "blacks like to copulate [schnackseln] a lot." These comments met with widespread criticism, and she expressed similar views in 2008, attributing alleged promiscuity in Africa to the continent's hot climate.

She went into isolation from society, studying finance, accounting, and estate management and selling off family property, including art, jewelry, castles, cars, and land to preserve the family fortune. During this time she undertook a spiritual pilgrimage to the Sanctuary of Our Lady of Lourdes in Lourdes, France, emerging as a Catholic activist.

After her sister, Maya, was diagnosed with lung cancer in 2012, Gloria accompanied her on pilgrimages to Lourdes and Santiago de Compostela Cathedral in Spain.

Gloria has become a successful artist, focusing mainly on oil paint and pastel portraits. The Hotel Chelsea asked her to do a series of pastels of its most famous denizens—a gallery show that brought her much acclaim as a painter. She has called herself a "dilettante" and cited her art collection as inspiration for her style of portraiture. In 2015 she had a solo show at the National Exemplar Gallery in New York. She also paints freelance.

Gloria works closely with conservative traditionalist Catholic leaders, including Archbishop Carlo Maria Viganò, Cardinal Raymond Leo Burke, Monsignor Wilhelm Imkamp, and Steve Bannon. Bannon suggested her palatial home, Schloss Thurn und Taxis, as a potential site for a school to educate and train right-wing Catholics, but no firm plans have been made. In 2024, she delivered a speech at the National Conservatism Conference in Brussels, where she advocated for traditional Catholic values and criticized the religious stance of Pope Francis. In July 2025, she described abortions as “infanticide” in an interview with the right-wing populist broadcaster Nius.

Princess Gloria is a personal friend of Hillary Clinton, and was one of a dozen women to attend her 2016 birthday party.

== Honours ==
In accordance with the Weimar Constitution of 1919, German law recognises hereditary titles only as part of surnames. Members of the Thurn and Taxis family include the title as part of their surname in the form Prinz/essin von Thurn und Taxis.

=== Dynastic ===
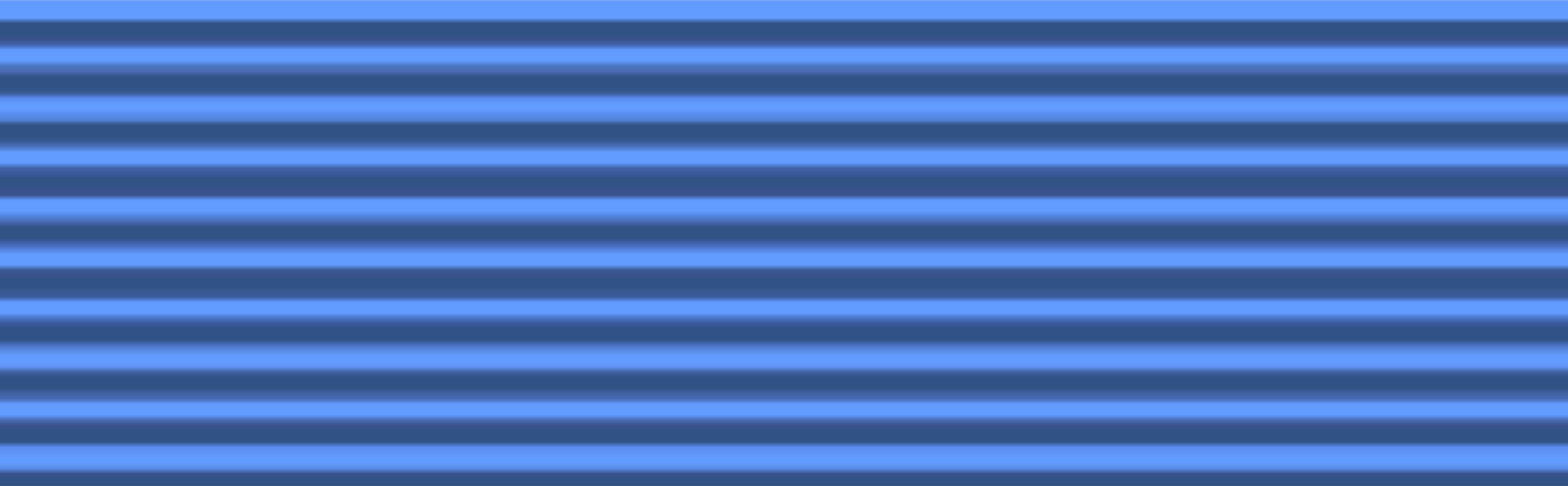
- Dame Grand Cross of the Order of Perfect Friendship (House of Thurn und Taxis)
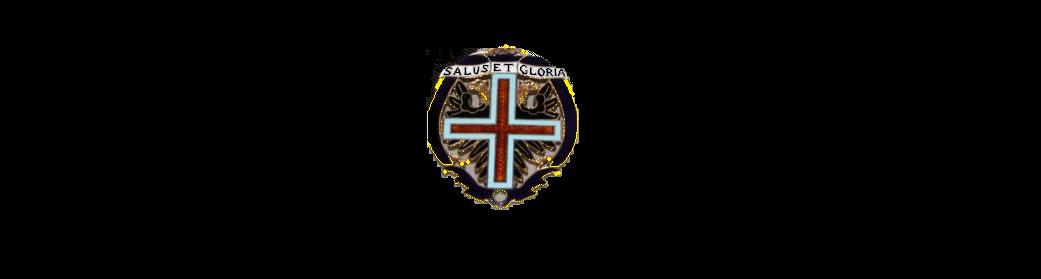
- Dame 1st Class of the Order of the Starry Cross (Austrian Imperial and Royal Family)

=== National ===
- Officer's Cross of the Order of Merit of the Federal Republic of Germany (Germany)
  - Member of the Decoration of Merit (Bavaria)

=== Foreign ===
- Vatican: Knight Grand Officer of the Order of St. Gregory the Great
- Sovereign Military Order of Malta: Dame of Honour and Devotion of the Order of Saint John

== Notable published works ==
- Unsere Umgangsformen. Die Welt der guten Sitten von A-Z - with Princess Alessandra Borghese - (2000). ISBN 9783806875799
- Gloria: Die Fürstin - Im Gespräch mit Peter Seewald (2005). ISBN 9783453380004
- Die Fürstin und der Kardinal - with Cardinal Joachim Meisner - (2008). ISBN 9783451298714
