= Beatrix, Countess of Schönburg-Glauchau =

Hungarian-German aristocrat (1930–2021)

Beatrix Széchenyi de Sárvár-Felsővidék
- Countess of Schönburg-Glauchau
- Full name: Beatrix Maria Valeria Thérèse Emerica Széchenyi de Sárvár-Felsővidék
- Born: 30 January 1930; Hegykő, Kingdom of Hungary
- Died: 30 September 2021 (aged 91); Regensburg, Bavaria, Germany
- Buried: Nordfriedhof, Munich, Germany
- Noble family: Széchenyi
- Spouse: Joachim, Count of Schönburg-Glauchau (m. 1957; div. 1986)
- Issue: Countess Maya von Schönburg-Glauchau; Gloria, Princess of Thurn and Taxis; Count Carl-Alban von Schönburg-Glauchau; Alexander, Count of Schönburg-Glauchau
- Father: Count Bálint Széchenyi de Sárvár-Felsővidék
- Mother: Princess Marie Pavlovna Galitzine

Beatrix, Countess of Schönburg-Glauchau (née Countess Beatrix Maria Valeria Thérèse Emerica Széchenyi de Sárvár-Felsővidék; 30 January 1930 – 30 September 2021) was a Hungarian-German aristocrat and socialite. By birth a member of the Széchényi family, a Hungarian noble family, she fled Hungary in 1956 during the Communist Revolution. After arriving in Germany, she married Joachim, Count of Schönburg-Glauchau, the nominal head of the House of Schönburg-Glauchau, and moved to Africa. She lived in Togo and Somalia, where her husband worked as a journalist, before returning to Germany in 1970. After divorcing her husband in 1986, she moved to Regensburg to live with her daughter, Gloria, Princess of Thurn und Taxis.

== Biography ==
Countess Beatrix Maria Széchenyi de Sárvár-Felsővidék was born in Hegykő, Kingdom of Hungary on 30 January 1930 to Count Bálint Széchenyi de Sárvár-Felsővidék and Princess Marie Maya Pavlovna Galitzine. She had three older sisters. Beatrix was a great-granddaughter of the Hungarian statesman Count István Széchenyi de Sárvár-Felsővidék. Her parents divorced in 1931, a year after her birth.

During the Hungarian Revolution of 1956, Beatrix and her family fled to Germany in order to escape the Communist regime.

In 1957 she married Joachim, Count of Schönburg-Glauchau, a German journalist and head of the Glauchau branch of the comital Schönburg family. Her husband's family's castles and estates in Saxony were seized by the Communist government during the Soviet Military Administration in Germany. She and her husband had four children:

- Countess Maya von Schönburg-Glauchau (1958–2019)
- Gloria, Princess of Thurn und Taxis (born 1960)
- Count Carl Alban von Schönburg-Glauchau (born 1966)
- Alexander, Count of Schönburg-Glauchau (born 1969), a best selling author who married Princess Irina of Hesse, a daughter of Prince Karl Adolf Andreas of Hesse, in 1999.

After her husband accepted a journalist post in Africa, she and her family spent five years living in Togo and Somalia, returning to Germany in 1970.

She and her husband divorced in 1986.

After suffering a fall at her apartment, she was taken to the Munich Municipal Clinic and underwent an operation. She was later transferred to the Brothers of Mercy Hospital in Regensburg, where she died on 30 September 2021. Her requiem mass took place on 6 November 2021 at the Kreuzkirche, Munich. The mass was celebrated by Hungarian bishop János Székely. Music for the ceremony was performed by opera singer Countess Christine Esterházy and the Fürstlichen Hofkapelle Thurn und Taxis. She was buried at Nordfriedhof.
