= Joachim, Count of Schönburg-Glauchau =

German journalist

Joachim
- Count of Schönburg-Glauchau
- Full name: German: Joachim Heinrich Maria Carl Rudolf Franz Xaver Joseph Antonius Christophorus Hubertus Alfons Graf von Schönburg-Glauchau
- Born: 4 February 1929; Glauchau, Free State of Saxony, Weimar Republic
- Died: 29 September 1998 (aged 69); Passau, Bavaria, Germany
- Buried: Basilika of Wechselburg
- Noble family: House of Schönburg
- Spouses: Countess Beatrix Széchényi (m. 1957; div. 1986) Ursula Zwicker (m. 1986)
- Issue: Maria Felicitas; Mariae Gloria; Carl-Alban Count von Schoenburg Glauchau, Alexander; Anabel Maya-Felicitas
- Father: Friedrich Carl, Count of Schönburg-Glauchau
- Mother: Maria Anna, Countess Baworowska z Baworowa (von Baworów)

Joachim Heinrich Maria Carl Rudolf Franz Xaver Joseph Antonius Christophorus Hubertus Alfons Graf von Schönburg-Glauchau (4 February 1929 – 29 September 1998) was the nominal head of the former mediatised German Counts of Schönburg-Glauchau until 1945. Dispossessed and expelled from his homeland in 1945, he and his family migrated to the Rhineland, where he was an author and journalist. After the fall of the Berlin Wall, he returned to his homeland, represented the district in the Bundestag, and served in local government.

== Early life ==
He grew up in the idyllic setting of Wechselburg in the Zwickauer Mulde river valley, about 25 kilometers north of Chemnitz. The Schönburg family had occupied the Schloss Rochsburg there since 1637. His parents were Count Friedrich Carl von Schönburg-Glauchau, born 26 July 1899 in Wechselburg and died 12 April 1945 in the defence of Breslau, and Countess Maria Anna Baworowska von Baworów (1902–1988). He was the second of their eight children.

=== Career ===
In 1945, Soviet troops arrested him, expropriated his property, and he and the family were deported, living for a while in Mainz. He supported his family as a journalist and author. In 1965, he accepted an assignment to Somalia, where he established a broadcast station, and served as a foreign correspondent. His family lived with him in the Horn of Africa for five years, and two of his children were born there.

Immediately after the fall of the Wall in 1990, he returned to Saxony, and from 1990 to 1994, served as a member of the Bundestag for the district of Glauchau-Rochlitz-Hohenstein-Ernstthal-Hainichen, in Saxony, for the Christian Democratic Union. In the so-called Berlin debate on 20 June 1991, he spoke against the transferring parliament and government to Berlin.

He is known for his stance on the protection of nature, and, as an author, for his books about hunting. One of his most popular books, the humorous Der Jagdgast (The Hunt Guest), tells old hunting stories from his homeland. Der deutsche Jäger (The German Hunter) is a combination of hunting stories and hunting practices.

From 1991 to 1997 he lived in the former family castle of Rochsburg, and served in the city council of Lunzenau.

== Personal life ==
Joachim was twice married. He married his first wife, Countess Beatrix Széchenyi de Sárvár et Felsővidék (1930–2021), on 27 October 1957 in Vienna. She was the great granddaughter of the Hungarian social reformer and national hero, Count István Széchényi. Before their divorce on 25 April 1986 in Munich, Bavaria, they were the parents of:

- Maria Felicitas Alexandra Albertina Assunta Anna Fernanda Beatrix von Schönburg-Glauchau (1958–2019), who married Friedrich Christian Flick, in 1985.
- Mariae Gloria Ferdinanda Joachima Josephine Wilhelmine Huberta von Schönburg-Glauchau (b. 1960), who married Johannes, 11th Prince of Thurn and Taxis, in 1980.
- Carl-Alban Count von Schönburg Glauchau, married Juliet Helene Beechley Fowler, daughter of Jutta Countess von Pfeil and Nicholas Beechy Fowler (b. 1966), who renounced his succession rights in 1995.
- Alexander, Count of Schönburg-Glauchau (b. 1969), a best selling author who married Princess Irina of Hesse, a daughter of Prince Karl Adolf Andreas of Hesse, in 1999.

From his second marriage, 18 July 1986, to Ursula Zwicker (b. 1951), there is one child:

- Anabel Maya-Felicitas (b. 1980).

In 1998, he became very sick, and moved to Passau, in Bavaria, where he died. He is buried in the old cloister Basilika in Wechselburg, his boyhood home.

== Titles ==
Family members up until 1919 held the title Graf; Following the German Revolution of 1918–19, the German nobility as a legally defined class was abolished on August 11, 1919 with the promulgation of the Weimar Constitution, under which all Germans were made equal before the law, and the legal rights and privileges due to all ranks of nobility ceased. Any title, however, held prior to the Weimar Constitution, were permitted to continue merely as part of the family name and heritage, or erased from future name use.

== Publications ==
- Der Jagdgast, München : BLV-Verlagsgesellschaft, 1986, 2. Aufl.
- Jagen mit dem "Uhu" Mainz : Hoffmann, 1985
- Hohe Jagd in Zentral- und Südeuropa, with Días de los Reyes, Antonio. - Herrsching : Schuler, _381 1983
- Der deutsche Jäger, München, Bern, Wien : BLV-Verlagsgesellschaft, 1979
