= Flick (surname) =

Flick is a surname, and may refer to:

- Barry Flick (born 1952), English cricketer
- Bertolt Flick (born 1964), German businessman
- Bill Flick (1927–2018), Canadian ice hockey player
- Bob Flick (born 1944), American politician
- Bradley Flick (born 1964), American aerospace engineer
- Bruce Flick (1933–2021), Australian basketball player
- D. J. Flick (born 1980), American gridiron football player
- Donatella Flick (born 1950, Italian philanthropist, divorced wife of Gert-Rudolf Flick
- Elmer Flick (1876–1971), American baseball player
- Florian Flick (born 2000), German footballer
- Friedrich Flick (1883–1972), German businessman and war criminal
- Friedrich Christian Flick (1944–2026), German-Swiss art collector and heir, son of Otto-Ernst Flick
- Friedrich Karl Flick (1927–2006), German businessperson, youngest son of Friedrich Flick
- Gert-Rudolf Flick (born 1943), German art historian and collector, son of Otto-Ernst Flick
- Giovanni Maria Flick (born 1940), Italian judge
- Gordon Flick (1921–2006), American basketball player
- Hansi Flick (born 1965), German football player and manager
- Hermann Flick (1905–1944), German footballer
- Isabel Flick (1928–2000), Australian Aboriginal rights activist
- Jamie Flick (born c.1961), American politician
- Jim Flick (1929–2012), American golf coach
- Joe Flick (c.1865–1889), Indigenous Australian outlaw
- Joé Flick (born 1979), Luxembourgish footballer
- Klaus-Dieter Flick (born 1937), German lawyer and broker
- Kweku Flick (born 2001), Ghanaian musician
- Larry Flick (born 1963), American music journalist
- James P. Flick (1845–1929), American politician
- Lawrence Flick (1856-1938), American physician
- Lew Flick (1915-1990), American baseball player
- Max Flick (born 1994), American soccer player
- Otto-Ernst Flick (1916–1974), German businessman, oldest son of Friedrich Flick
- Rob Flick (born 1991), Canadian ice hockey player
- Sherrie Flick (born 1967), American fiction writer
- Stephen Hunter Flick (born 1949), American sound editor
- Thorsten Flick (born 1976), German footballer
- Tom Flick (born 1958), American football player
- Vic Flick (1937–2024), English guitarist
- William Albert Flick (1890–1980), Australian pest exterminator

== See also ==
- Flick family, German industrialists
- Flick trial, war crimes trial
- Flack (surname)
- Fleck, surname
- Flock (surname)
- Fluck, surname
