= Flock =

Flock, flocks or flocking may refer to:

- Flock (birds), a gathering of individual birds to forage or travel collectively
- Flock (sheep), term for a group of sheep

== Arts and entertainment ==
=== Music ===
- Flock (Bell X1 album), 2005
- Flock (Jane Weaver album), 2021
- The Flock (band), an American jazz rock band 1969–1970
  - The Flock (album), 1969
- Flock: The Best of the Mutton Birds, a 2002 compilation album by The Mutton Birds

=== Gaming ===
- Flock!, a 2009 video game
- The Flock (video game), a 2015 multiplayer-only survival horror video game
- Flock (video game), a 2024 video game published by Annapurna Interactive

=== Other uses in arts and entertainment ===
- Flock (sculpture), by Michael Christian, 2001
- The Flock (film), a 2007 film starring Richard Gere
- Flocking (film), a 2015 Swedish film
- The Flock, a 2006 novel by James Robert Smith
- Flock (literary journal), formerly Fiction Fix
- Flock, a fictional character in Doraemon: Nobita's Treasure Island

== People ==
- Flock (surname)

== Science and technology ==
=== Animals ===
- Flock, a collective noun for various animals:
- Flock (birds), a gathering of individual birds to forage or travel collectively
- Species flock, a diverse group of closely related species in an isolated area
- Flocking (behavior), the behavior exhibited by a group of birds

=== Computing ===
- Flock (messaging service), a proprietary messaging and collaboration tool
- Flock (web browser), a discontinued web browser
- Flock system call, used for computer file locking
- F-Lock, a function lock key on a computer keyboard
- FlockDB, an open-source graph database

=== Other uses in science and computing ===
- Flocking agent, or clarifying agent, in chemistry, to induce flocculation
- Flock (satellite), by Planet Labs
- Flock Safety, a licence plate recognition company
  - Flock camera, a camera used by Flock Safety

== Other uses ==
- Flocking (texture), depositing many small fiber particles onto a surface
- The Flock (professional wrestling), or Raven's Nest, a professional wrestling stable

== See also ==
- Congregation (disambiguation)
- Little Flock (disambiguation)
- A Flock of Seagulls, English new wave band
- Breed registry, or flock book
- Flocculation, a process by which colloidal particles come out of suspension in the form of floc
- Flock bronzewing or flock pigeon, Phaps histrionica, a bird
- Flocke (born 2007), a polar bear born in captivity
- Phlox, a genus of plants
