= Flock (surname) =

Flock or Flöck is a surname, and may refer to:

- Bob Flock (1918–1964), American racing driver, brother of Fonty Flock and Tim Flock
- Carmella Flöck (1898–1982), Austrian resistance member
- Dirk Flock (born 1972), German footballer and manager
- Dorothea Flock (1608-1630), German woman executed for witchcraft
- Elizabeth Flock, American journalist and author
- Fonty Flock (1921–1972), American racing driver, brother of Bob Flock and Tim Flock
- Hans Flock (1940–2025), Norwegian judge
- James F. Flock, United States Marine Corps general
- Janine Flock (born 1989), Austrian skeleton racer
- Kevin Perez, stage name Kay Flock (born 2003), American rapper
- Kendra Flock (born 1985), Canadian association football player
- Robert Herman Flock (born 1956), American Catholic prelate
- Tim Flock (1924–1998), American racing driver, brother of Bob Flock and Fonty Flock

== See also ==
- Flack (surname)
- Fleck, surname
- Fluck, surname
