= Flack (surname) =

Flack is a surname, and may refer to:

- Audrey Flack (1931–2024), American painter and sculptor
- Caroline Flack (1979–2020), British television presenter
- Doug Flack (1920–2005), English footballer
- Edwin Flack (1873–1935), Australian Olympic athlete in track and field and tennis
- Hertha E. Flack (1916–2019), American philanthropist and painter
- Hugh Flack (1903–after 1933), Irish footballer
- John Flack (bishop) (born 1942), British bishop of the Anglican Church
- John Flack (British politician) (born 1957), British Conservative politician
- Karen Flack, American mechanical engineer
- Layne Flack (1969–2021), American professional poker player
- Marjorie Flack (1897–1958), American author of children's books
- Max Flack (1890–1975), American professional baseball player
- Roberta Flack (1937–2025), American jazz and soul singer
- Sophie Flack (born 1983), American ballerina
- Steve Flack (born 1971), English professional football player
- William H. Flack (1861–1907), American politician from New York; U.S. representative 1903–07

== See also ==
- Flach (surname)
- Fleck, surname
- Fluck, surname
