= Flach (surname) =

Flach is a surname of German origin.

It is derived from the German noun flach, meaning "flat", and is thus a topographic surname for a person living in flat terrain. It some cases, it is derived from the Czech word vlach, meaning "foreigner", specifically used for foreigners who spoke a Romance language (Vlachs). Notable people with the surname include:

- André Flach (born 1976), Dutch politician
- Beat Flach (born 1965), Swiss politician
- Émile Flach (1853–1926), Monégasque politician
- Frederic Flach (1927–2006), American psychiatrist and author
- Geoffroi Jacques Flach (1846–1919), French jurist and historian
- Igor Flach (1966–2008), German musician
- Jakob Flach (1894–1982), Swiss painter
- Doug Flach (born 1970), American tennis player
- Karl Flach (1821–1866), German mechanic and engineer
- Karl-Hermann Flach (1929–1973), German journalist and politician
- Ken Flach (1963–2018), American tennis player
- Leon Flach (born 2001), American soccer player
- Matthias Flach (rower) (born 1982), German rower
- Matthias Flach (mathematician) (born 1963), German mathematician
- Peter Flach (born 1961), Dutch computer scientist
- Sergej Flach, German physicist
- Thomas Flach (born 1956), German sailor
- Tim Flach (born 1958), British photographer

== See also ==
- Flach (disambiguation)
