= Flak (disambiguation) =

Flak (from German Flugabwehrkanone (Flak) 'aircraft defence cannon' is anti-aircraft fire from anti-aircraft guns.

Flak or FlaK may also refer to:

== Arts, entertainment and media ==
- Flak (video game), 1984
- Flak Magazine, an early American online magazine
- Flak, fictional commanding officer in video game Advance Wars 2: Black Hole Rising
- F.L.A.K., a G.I. Joe toy battlefield accessory
- FL4K, a robot in video game Borderlands 3

== People ==
- Edward Flak (1948–2020), Polish politician and lawyer
- Simon Flak (1923–1999), Franco-Polish footballer and manager

== Other uses ==
- Preflagellin peptidase, designated FlaK, an enzyme
- Flak, negative responses to a media statement or broadcast, in the propaganda model of Herman and Chomsky

== See also ==
- FLAC (disambiguation)
- Flack (disambiguation)
- Flak jacket, a form of body armor
- Flak tower, anti-aircraft gun blockhouse towers constructed by Nazi Germany
