= Flack =

Flack may refer to:

- Flack (TV series), a 2019 American-British TV series
- Flack, Virginia, the former name of Waynesboro
- Flack (or Flak), an informal term for a publicity manager
- Flacking, a self-coined term for the art created by Ememem

== People with the surname ==
- Flack (surname)

=== Characters ===
- Donald Flack Jr., character on the American television series CSI: NY
- George Flack, a newspaper correspondent in Henry James' novel The Reverberator

== See also ==
- Flak (disambiguation)
- Fleck, a surname
