= Hacke =

Hacke is a German surname. Notable people with the surname include:

- Alexander Hacke (born 1965), German musician
- Hans Christoph Friedrich Graf von Hacke (1699–1754), Prussian general
- Jens Hacke (born 1973), German political scientist

== See also ==
- Hack (disambiguation)
