= FLAC (disambiguation) =

FLAC may refer to:

- Free Lossless Audio Codec, an audio data compression scheme.
- Free Legal Advice Centres, an Irish organization
- Florida Automatic Computer, an early digital electronic computer
- Striplin FLAC, an ultralight aircraft, where the abbreviation stands for Foot Launched Air Cycle

== See also ==
- FLAK (disambiguation)
