= Hans-Georg Fleck =

German historian

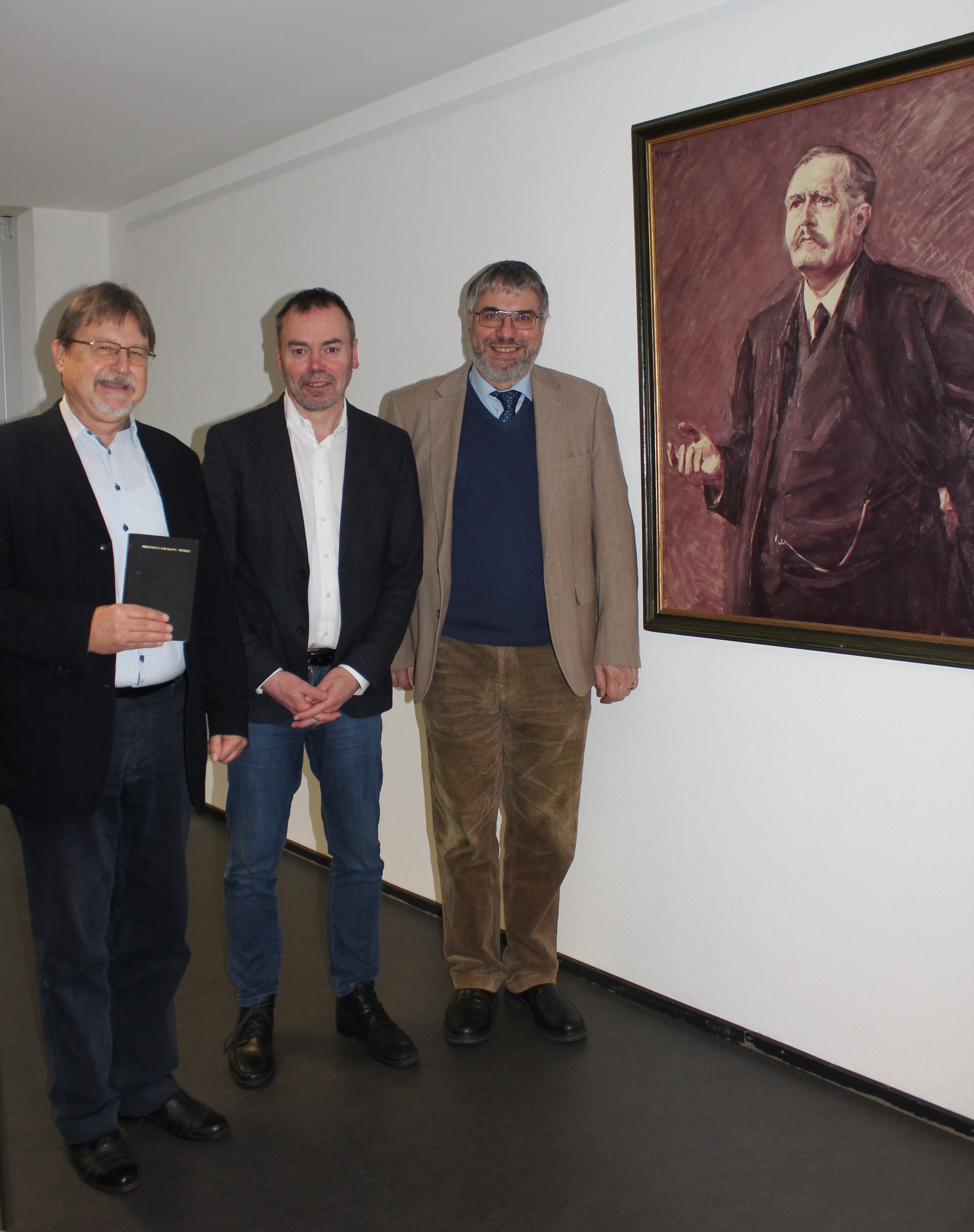
Hans-Georg Fleck (left) in the Archive of Liberalism, next to him Ewald Grothe and Jürgen Frölich

Hans-Georg Fleck (born July 15, 1953, in Trier) is a German historian and former Country Director at Friedrich-Naumann-Stiftung für die Freiheit (FNF).

== Biography ==
At the age of five he moved with his parents and his two elder siblings to Neuwied where he lived until he graduated from the Werner-Heisenberg-Gymnasium Neuwied in 1972. His scholarly performance led him to receive a scholarship from the Studienstiftung des Deutschen Volkes to fund his tertiary education. He went on to study at the University of Bonn and the University of Würzburg, receiving a Magister Artium in History, Political Science and Philosophy in 1979. From 1979 to 1982, Fleck worked as a research assistant at the History Department, University of Cologne. It was at this time that he started working on his PhD on the history of liberal trade unions in Germany, for which he received the Wolf-Erich-Kellner Prize in 1991. From 1985 to 1990, Fleck worked as an academic researcher at the Archive of the Federal Foreign Office in Bonn being a member of the Editorial Group of Akten zur Deutschen Auswärtigen Politik (ADAP). As a staffer of the German Free Democratic Party (FDP), Fleck was tasked in March 1990 to support the preparation of the first democratic Parliamentary Elections in the German Democratic Republic (DDR).

In 1991, Fleck became Country Director of the Friedrich Naumann Foundation for Freedom in Warsaw/Poland. Following a 6-year stint in Poland, Fleck moved in 1997 to head the FNF program for the former Yugoslavia based in Zagreb/Croatia. In 2005, he moved to Jerusalem as FNF's Country Director for Israel and Palestine and in 2012, he relocated to Istanbul as the foundation's Country Director for Turkey. In his capacity as Country Director, Fleck has engaged with high-ranking politicians, prestigious academic scholars, civil society leaders, and influential businessmen. Fleck has published extensively in German and international periodicals on, i.a., topics of liberalism and democratization. He is a popular political analyst for German media.

From 1989 till 2011 Fleck was Co-Editor of the Yearbook on Liberalism Research.

Fleck is married to Annette Lippke; they have three children.

== Academic Work ==
In his academic publications, Fleck focuses on the theories and the history of Liberalism. He has been particularly interested in the historic development of the concept of ‘social liberalism’, which is rooted in the formation of workers’ education, cooperatives, and trade unions. Fleck has also engaged extensively with the politics of historical narratives and remembrance in Post-World War II Europe trying to understand the drivers and formative elements of newly (re-)constructed national identities.

== Literature ==
- Fleck, Hans-Georg (1984). "Soziale Gerechtigkeit durch Organisationsmacht und Interessenausgleich. Ausgewählte Aspekte zur Geschichte der sozialliberalen Gewerkschaften." [Social Justice through Organizational Power and the Reconciliation of Interests. Selected Aspects of the History of Socially Liberal Trade Unions.]. In Matthias, Erich; Schönhoven, Klaus (eds.). Solidarität und Menschenwürde. Etappen der deutschen Gewerkschaftsgeschichte von den Anfängen bis zur Gegenwart [Solidarity and Human Dignity. Stages in German trade union history from the beginnings to the present.] (in German). Bonn: Verlag Neue Gesellschaft. pp. 83–106.
- Fleck, Hans-Georg (1993). "Von den Unannehmlichkeiten einer Auseinandersetzung mit der gesellschaftlichen Realität. Liberale Reaktionen auf sozialpolitische Herausforderungen in Kaiserreich und Weimarer Republik." [On the Inconveniences of Coming to Terms with Social Reality. Liberal Reactions to Socio-Political Challenges in the Empire and the Weimar Republic.]. Liberalismus und Soziale Frage(n). 5. Rastatter Tag zur Geschichte des Liberalismus, 07./08.11.1992 [Liberalism and Social Question(s). 5th Rastatt Day on the History of Liberalism, 07./08.11.1992.] (in German). Sankt Augustin: Comdok. pp. 27–56.
- Fleck, Hans-Georg; Ławniczak, Ryszard (1993). Alternative Models of Market Economy for Transition Economies. Warszawa.
- Fleck, Hans-Georg (1991). Sozialliberalismus und Gewerkschaftsbewegung. Die Hirsch-Dunckerschen Gewerkvereine 1868–1914 [Social Liberalism and the Trade Union Movement. The Hirsch-Duncker Trade Union Associations 1868–1914.] (in German). Köln: Bund-Verlag.
- Fleck, Hans-Georg; Kołodzieczyk, Ryszard (1994). Liberale Traditionen in Polen [Liberal traditions in Poland.] (in German). Warszawa.
- Fleck, Hans-Georg; Pszczółkowski, Tomasz G. (1997). Nowoczesny Liberalizm. Materiały z konferencji Warszawa 26.–28.05.1992 [Modern Liberalism. Materials from the conference Warsaw 26.–28.05.1992.] (in Polish). Warszawa.
- Fleck, Hans-Georg (2000). Prošlost je teško pitanje [The Past – A Complicated Matter] (in Croatian). Zagreb.
- Fleck, Hans-Georg; Graovac, Igor. Dijalog povjesničara – istoričara 1.–8. Zagreb 2000–2004 [Dialogue between historians and historians 1–8. Zagreb 2000–2004.] (in Croatian). Zagreb.
- Fleck, Hans-Georg (2002). "Sozialer Liberalismus und Gewerkschaftsbewegung in Preußen." [Social liberalism and trade union movement in Prussia.]. Jahrbuch zur Liberalismus-Forschung [Yearbook on Liberalism Research] (in German). Sankt Augustin: Comdok. pp. 259–280.
- Fleck, Hans-Georg (2005). "O Dijalogu povjesničara/istoričara: kritička povijesna znanost, politico obrazovanje I društveni pluralizam." [About the Historians‘ Dialogue: Critical Historiography, Civic Education and Societal Pluralism]. In Bjelajac, Mile; Feldman, Andre (eds.). Čemu dijalog povjesničara/istoričara? [Why the dialogue of historians / historians?] (in Croatian). Zagreb. pp. 17–37.
- Fleck, Hans-Georg (2006). "In Search of a Liberal Identity: Transition to Democracy, Liberal Heritage, and Liberal Parties in Eastern Europe.". Jahrbuch zur Liberalismus-Forschung [Yearbook on Liberalism Research] (in German). pp. 203–238.
- Fleck, Hans-Georg (2007). "Benevolenz, Mißachtung, Mißtrauen trotz „Schicksalsgemeinschaft" – Organisierter Linksliberalismus und sozialliberale Gesellschaftsreform zu Zeiten Eugen Richters." [Benevolence, disregard, mistrust despite "community of fate" – organised left-liberalism and social-liberal social reform in Eugen Richter's time.]. Jahrbuch zur Liberalismus-Forschung [Yearbook on Liberalism Research] (in German). pp. 47–82.
- Fleck, Hans-Georg (2010). "Aufbruch – zu konträren Ufern. Ein Briefwechsel des jungen Karl-Hermann Flach." [Departure - to contrary shores. An exchange of letters by the young Karl-Hermann Flach.]. Jahrbuch zur Liberalismus-Forschung [Yearbook on Liberalism Research] (in German). pp. 215–250.
- Fleck, Hans-Georg (2012). "Wider die „Zügellosigkeit des sozialen Faustrechts". Gewerkschaftlicher Sozialliberalismus und Deutsche Fortschrittspartei." [Against the "licentiousness of the social law of the fist". Trade union social liberalism and the German Progressive Party.]. In Lehnert, Detlef (ed.). Sozialliberalismus in Europa. Herkunft und Entwicklung im 19. und frühen 20. Jahrhundert [Social Liberalism in Europe. Origin and development in the 19th and early 20th centuries.] (in German). Böhlau, Wien, Köln, Weimar. pp. 83–107.
- Fleck, Hans-Georg (2012). "Sozialliberalismus und Gesellschaftsreform seit der Reichsgründung." [Social liberalism and social reform since the foundation of the German Reich.]. In Lehnert, Detlef (ed.). Sozialliberalismus in Europa. Herkunft und Entwicklung im 19. und frühen 20. Jahrhundert [Social Liberalism in Europe. Origin and development in the 19th and early 20th centuries.] (in German). Böhlau, Wien, Köln, Weimar. pp. 51–65.
