= Flach =

Flach may refer to:

- Flach (surname), a surname of German origin
- Flach (submarine), a Chilean submarine
- Flachsee, an artificial lake in Rottenschwil, Switzerland
