= Hartwin Brandt =

German ancient historian

Hartwin Brandt (born 29 June 1959 in Flensburg) is a German ancient historian.

Hartwin Brandt studied history, German studies and Latin philology at the University of Kiel from 1979 to 1985. After his first Staatsexamen in 1985, he received his doctorate from Frank Kolb in 1986 and then his habilitation in 1991 from the University of Tübingen, where he was a research assistant from 1986 until 1992. Brandt was an acting professor at the University of Leipzig in 1992/3. Since 1993 he has been regular professor of ancient history, first at Chemnitz University of Technology and then since 2002 at the university of Bamberg.

In 2003/4 Brandt was Visiting Professor at the University of Exeter and he was a member of the board of directors of the Historians' Union from 2000 to 2006. He was Henkel Fellow and Visiting Professor at the Department of Classics at Brown University in Providence (US) in 2006/7. In addition, Brandt has been speaker of the graduate college Generationenbewusstsein und Generationenkonflikte in Antike und Mittelalter (Generational Consciousness and Generational Conflict in Antiquity and the Middle Ages) since October 2004.

== Research and Projects ==
Brandt's main areas of research are Late Antiquity, historiography of Late Antiquity (especially the Historia Augusta), the investigation of special groups in Antiquity (e.g. the elderly), and the history of Roman colonisation of Asia Minor.

- Survey of the archaeological, epigraphic and historical development of the ancient polis of Pednelissos, supported by the Deutsche Forschungsgemeinschaft through the research project Formen und Wege der Akkulturation im östlichen Mittelmeerraum und Schwarzmeergebiet in der Antike (Ways & Means of Acculturation in the Easter Mediterranean and Black Sea Region in Antiquity).
- Editor of the supplements of the journal Klio, together with Martin Jehne.
- Handbuch der Altertumswissenschaft: Geschichte der Römischen Kaiserzeit (New version of the old volume, which was written by Hermann Bengtson.

== Selected works ==
- Zeitkritik in der Spätantike. Untersuchungen zu den Reformvorschlägen des Anonymus De rebus bellicis (Social Criticism in Late Antiquity: Investigations of the Reform Proposals of the Anonymus De rebus bellicis) (= Vestigia. Vol. 40). C. H. Beck, München 1988, ISBN 3-406-33003-7 (Dissertation).
- Gesellschaft und Wirtschaft Pamphyliens und Pisidiens im Altertum (Society and Economy of Pamphylia and Pisidia in Antiquity) (= Asia-Minor-Studien. Vol. 7). Habelt, Bonn 1992, ISBN 3-7749-2554-2 (Habilitationsschrift).
- Kommentar zur Vita Maximi et Balbini der Historia Augusta (Commentary on the Vita Maximi et Balbini der Historia Augusta) (= Antiquitas. Set 4, Series 3, Vol. 2). Habelt, Bonn 1996, ISBN 3-7749-2785-5.
- Geschichte der römischen Kaiserzeit. Von Diokletian und Konstantin bis zum Ende der konstantinischen Dynastie (284–363). (History of the Roman Imperial Period. From Diocletian and Constantine to the End of the Constantinian Dynasty (284-363)) Akademie Verlag, Berlin 1998, ISBN 3-05-003281-2.
- Das Ende der Antike. Geschichte des spätrömischen Reiches. (The End of Antiquity: History of the Late Roman Empire). C. H. Beck, München 2001, ISBN 3-406-44751-1 (Review on Plekos; 4th Revised Edition. C. H. Beck, München 2010, ISBN 978-3-406-51918-5).
- "Wird auch silbern mein Haar." Eine Geschichte des Alters in der Antike. ("My Hair will also be Grey" A History of Old Age in Antiquity). C. H. Beck, München 2002, ISBN 3-406-49593-1.
- Die Provinz Lycia et Pamphylia.(The Province of Lycia et Pamphylia) Zabern, Mainz 2005, ISBN 3-8053-3470-2 (with Frank Kolb).
- Konstantin der Große. Der erste christliche Kaiser. Eine Biographie. (Constantine the Great: The First Christian Emperor. A Biography). C. H. Beck, München 2006, ISBN 3-406-54058-9 (Review on sehepunkte; 3rd Unrevised Edition. C. H. Beck, München 2011, ISBN 978-3-406-61809-3).
- Am Ende des Lebens. Alter, Tod und Suizid in der Antike (At the End of Life: Old Age, Death and Suicide in Antiquity) (= Zetemata. Vol. 136). C. H. Beck, München 2010, ISBN 978-3-406-60169-9.
