= Doug Flack =

English footballer

Personal information
- Full name: Douglas Billy Halbert Flack
- Date of birth: 24 October 1920
- Place of birth: Staines-upon-Thames, England
- Date of death: 18 October 2005 (aged 84)
- Place of death: Purley, England
- Position: Goalkeeper

Youth career
- –1935: Corinthian
- 1935–1938: Fulham

Senior career*
| Years | Team | Apps | (Gls) |
| 1938–1953 | Fulham | 54 | (0) |
| 1953–1954 | Walsall | 11 | (0) |

Managerial career
- Corinthian-Casuals
- 1966–1971: Tooting & Mitcham United
- * Club domestic league appearances and goals

Douglas Billy Halbert Flack (24 October 1920 – 18 October 2005) was an English professional footballer who played in the Football League for Fulham and Walsall as a goalkeeper. After his retirement as a player, he managed Corinthian-Casuals and Tooting & Mitcham United.

== Personal life ==
Flack attended Spring Grove Grammar School. He served in India with the Royal Air Force during the Second World War.

== Career statistics ==
Appearances and goals by club, season and competition
| Club | Season | League | | | FA Cup | | Total | |
| Club | Season | Division | Apps | Goals | Apps | Goals | Apps | Goals |
|---|---|---|---|---|---|---|---|---|
| Fulham | 1948–49 | Second Division | 29 | 0 | 1 | 0 | 30 | 0 |
| Fulham | 1949–50 | First Division | 17 | 0 | 0 | 0 | 17 | 0 |
| Fulham | 1951–52 | First Division | 3 | 0 | 0 | 0 | 3 | 0 |
| Fulham | 1952–53 | Second Division | 5 | 0 | 0 | 0 | 5 | 0 |
| Career total | | | 54 | 0 | 1 | 0 | 55 | 0 |

== Honours ==
Fulham

- Football League Second Division: 1948–49
