= Karen Flack =

American mechanical engineer

Karen Ashby Flack is an American mechanical engineer specializing in experimental fluid dynamics. She is a professor of mechanical engineering at the United States Naval Academy.

== Education and career ==
Flack studied mechanical engineering at Rice University, graduating in 1986. After working for Rockwell Space Operations Company at the Johnson Space Center and then earning a master's degree at the University of California, Berkeley in 1988, she completed her Ph.D. at Stanford University in 1993, and in the same year joined the Naval Academy faculty. She became a full professor there in 2004 and chaired the mechanical engineering department from 2014 to 2018.

== Recognition ==
In 2014, Flack was named a Fellow of the American Physical Society (APS), after a nomination by the APS Division of Fluid Dynamics, "for her clarifying work on the structure of three dimensional turbulent boundary layers, and for better characterizing the connections between surface roughness geometry and boundary layer drag".

== Personal life ==
Flack married Navy pilot Jeff Flack in 1988.
