= Florida Automatic Computer =

FLAC, the Florida Automatic Computer, was an early digital electronic computer built for the United States Air Force at Patrick Air Force Base (PAFB) in Brevard County of Florida, to perform missile data reduction. The computer began service in 1953.

The system's architecture resembled that of the many machines of the period that used the von Neumann architecture, and in design was most closely related to SEAC. It was operated by RCA's Data Reduction Group, a subcontractor to Pan American Airways. Three FLACs were ultimately built, with two upgraded FLAC systems (dubbed "FLAC II") entering service in the fall of 1956. FLAC computations supported the flight tests of early ballistic missiles and air-breathing cruise missiles such as the Redstone, Juno, Snark, Matador, Bomarc, Navaho, Atlas, and Thor.

== History ==
Design on the computer was begun in December 1950 at PAFB's Atlantic Missile Range. The Air Force Civilian engineering team assembled to design and build the computer consisted of seven key members: Thomas G. Holmes, Charlie West, John MacNeill, Jim Bellinger, Steve Batchelor, Bruce Smith and Harlan Manweiler. Thomas G. Holmes was responsible for the overall logical design of the computer, ensuring all of the components worked together. He determined how to interconnect the modules to provide the control and numeric function of the computer. Charlie West was the director of the project. John MacNeill and Jim Bellinger were the mechanical engineers responsible for designing all of the system mechanisms. Jim also designed the input-output system. The punch design increased the existing punch speeds dramatically. Existing punch systems operated at around 10 characters per second but Jim's design was capable of over 400 characters per second. Jim also developed a reader for the paper tape input system. Steve Batchelor was in charge of purchasing and manufacturing. Bruce Smith was in charge of designing the building modules to be used in the design and Harlan Manweiler was the comptroller.

=== Specifications ===
Like the ENIAC, EDVAC, and other early computers, FLAC's basic electronic element was the vacuum tube, but it also used crystal diodes for gating. The complete system comprised 1,050 vacuum tubes of 5 different types and 18,000 crystal diodes, but the computer proper used only 420 6AN5 tubes and 15,000 diodes. FLAC's electronic components were built into 7 different kinds of exchangeable plug-in units which could be inserted or removed into 6 separate cabinets (excluding those for power and air conditioning), permitting faulty units to be replaced quickly to restore the machine to functionality following, for example, the burn-out of a vacuum tube.

FLAC consumed 7.5 kW of power (plus another 7.5 kW for the air conditioning needed to cool the computer) and occupied 455 cubic feet (12.9 m^{3}) of space over 65 square feet (plus an additional 52 cubic feet (1.5 m^{3}) over 18 square feet (1.7 m^{2}) for air conditioning). It weighed 1000 pounds. The approximate cost of the basic system was $500,000 to the USAF PAFB.

The system was fixed-point binary and used 45 binary digits per word (44 numerical, plus one for the sign). Instruction words were the same length as data words, and the computer used 19 total instructions and three-address code instruction type. All numbers were scaled to less than 1 in absolute value. It had built-in automatic decimal-to-binary and binary-to-decimal number conversion that worked at 500 words/second. The system clock ran at 1 MHz. Addition operations took, on average, 850 microseconds, whereas multiplications and divisions took 3300 microseconds.

The system used both a 512-word mercury delay line and magnetic tape for memory, and for data input, the system was equipped to process Flexowriter paper tape (at a rate of 1 word/second), magnetic wire (40 words/second), Raytheon magnetic tape (250 words/second), and paper tape (150 characters/second). The system could output to Flexowriter paper tape (at a rate of 1 word/second), magnetic wire (20 words/second), or paper tape (180 characters/second).

=== Use ===
All programming for FLAC was written in machine language, as the machine lacked any high-level language, assembler or compiler. Typical programs transformed missile tracking data from missile tests, recorded to rolls of seven-hole Flexowriter punched paper tape, cartridges of magnetic wire, and reels of magnetic tape, into missile trajectory and performance data.

During its service life, FLAC was operated by an engineer or technician and one operator for two 8-hour shifts. It had an operational uptime of about 90%.

Other features of the computer included insertion of short words, automatic truncation, automatic zero suppression, automatic scaling, and printed format control.

FLAC I was housed in a three-story wooden building south of the cafeteria at PAFB, while the two FLAC II systems were built in the South Wing of the Tech Lab in summer and fall of 1956. FLAC II abandoned mercury delay-line memory in favor of a faster and more versatile 4096-word magnetic core memory.

The FLAC machines' service life ended in 1960, whereupon they were replaced by IBM 709 scientific computers.

== Soroban Engineering ==
Some of the USAF personnel involved in the construction of FLAC, including Thomas G. Holmes, Charlie West, John MacNeill, Jim Bellinger, Steve Batchelor and Harlan Manweiler, together with Jim Allen, later went on to form Soroban Engineering, (later Mohawk Data) in Melbourne, Florida.

== See also ==
- 1950s computers
- Computer-related introductions in 1953
