= Flock (sculpture) =

Flock

Michael Christian's Flock is a 42-foot sculpture made of welded steel. First seen at Burning Man in 2001, it was donated in November 2005 to the city of San Francisco by the Black Rock Arts Foundation as a temporary installation displayed until February 2006.
