= Frederic Flach =

American psychiatrist (1927–2006)

Frederic Francis Flach (January 25, 1927 – September 26, 2006) was an American psychiatrist and author. He graduated from Cornell University Medical College where he served as Adjunct Associate Professor of Psychiatry. He was an attending psychiatrist at the Payne Whitney Clinic (New York Hospital) and at St. Vincent's Hospital and Medical Center. Frederic died in 2006.

== Awards and honors ==
In 1996, he was awarded the Maxine Mason Award by the National Alliance on Mental Illness (NAMI). He was a Knight Commander of the Equestrian Order of the Holy Sepulchre of Jerusalem (Catholic).

== Books ==
- The Secret Strength of Depression
- Putting the Pieces Together Again
- A New Marriage, A New Life
- The Secret Strength of Angels
- Faith, Healing and Miracles
- Resilience
- Rickie
- Fridericus
