= Hermann Flick =

German footballer (1905–1944)

Personal information
- Date of birth: 22 November 1905
- Place of birth: Kehl, Germany
- Date of death: 19 January 1944 (aged 38)
- Position: Midfielder

Senior career*
Years	Team	Apps	(Gls)
- TuS Duisburg 48/99
- SV Guts-Muts Dresden

International career
1929	Germany	1	(0)
- * Club domestic league appearances and goals

Hermann Flick (22 November 1905 – 19 January 1944) was a German footballer who played as a midfielder for TuS Duisburg 48/99, SV Guts-Muts Dresden and the Germany national team.

He was killed in action in World War II serving on the Eastern Front near Leningrad in January 1944 aged 38.
