= James F. Flock =

United States Marine Corps general

James F. Flock is a retired major general in the United States Marine Corps. Served with VMFA531 USS Coral sea Operation Eagle Claw April 24,25 1980.

== Career ==
Flock entered the Marine Corps from Milwaukee, Wisconsin in 1975. Following commissioning, he attended The Basic School at MCB Quantico, Virginia and flight training in Florida and Texas. Designated as a Naval Aviator, he initially flew the F-4 Phantom II, later transitioning to the F/A-18 Hornet. He was given the aviator call sign "Flocker". During his career, he was Commanding Officer of Marine Fighter Attack Squadron 323 (VMFA-323) at MCAS El Toro, California; Commanding Officer of Marine Aircraft Group 12 at MCAS Iwakuni, Japan; Commanding General of Marine Corps Base Camp Smedley D. Butler, Okinawa; and Commanding General of the 2nd Marine Aircraft Wing at MCAS Cherry Point, North Carolina. He has served tours of duty afloat embarked aboard the aircraft carriers USS Coral Sea (CV-43) and USS Constellation (CV-64), as well as ashore at Headquarters Marine Corps. His retirement was effective as of October 1, 2010.

His personal awards include the [Navy Distinguished Service Medal], the Defense Superior Service Medal, the Legion of Merit with oak leaf cluster, the Defense Meritorious Service Medal, the Meritorious Service Medal with oak leaf cluster, the Air Medal with strike/flight numeral, and the Navy Commendation Medal.

== Education ==
- B.S. – mechanical engineering, University of Wisconsin–Milwaukee
