= Archive of Liberalism =

Political archive in Germany

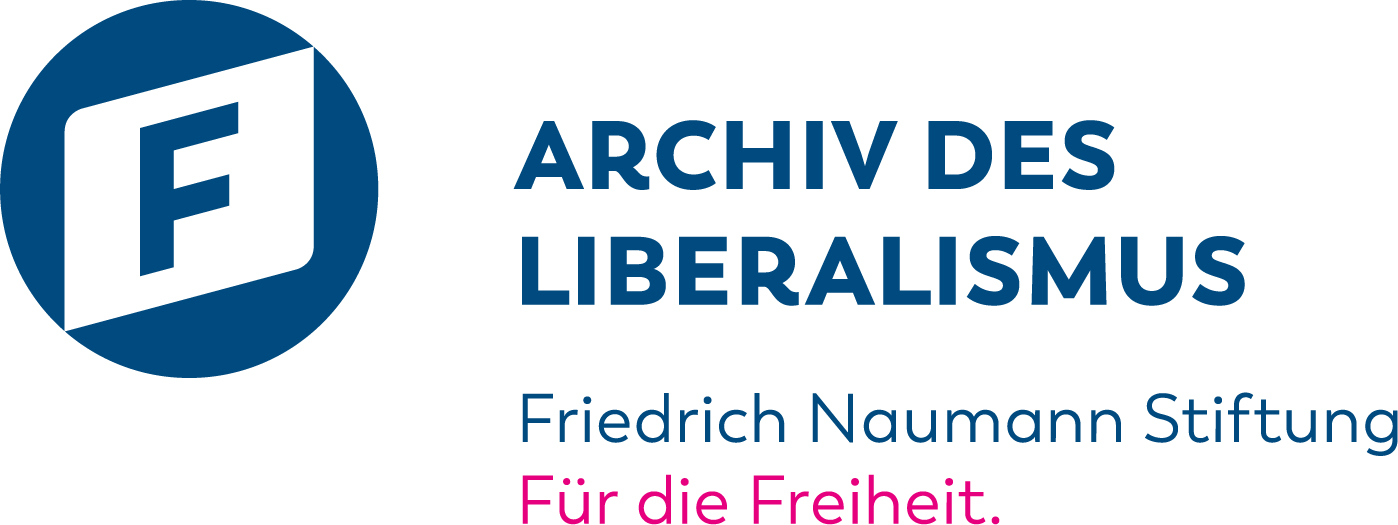

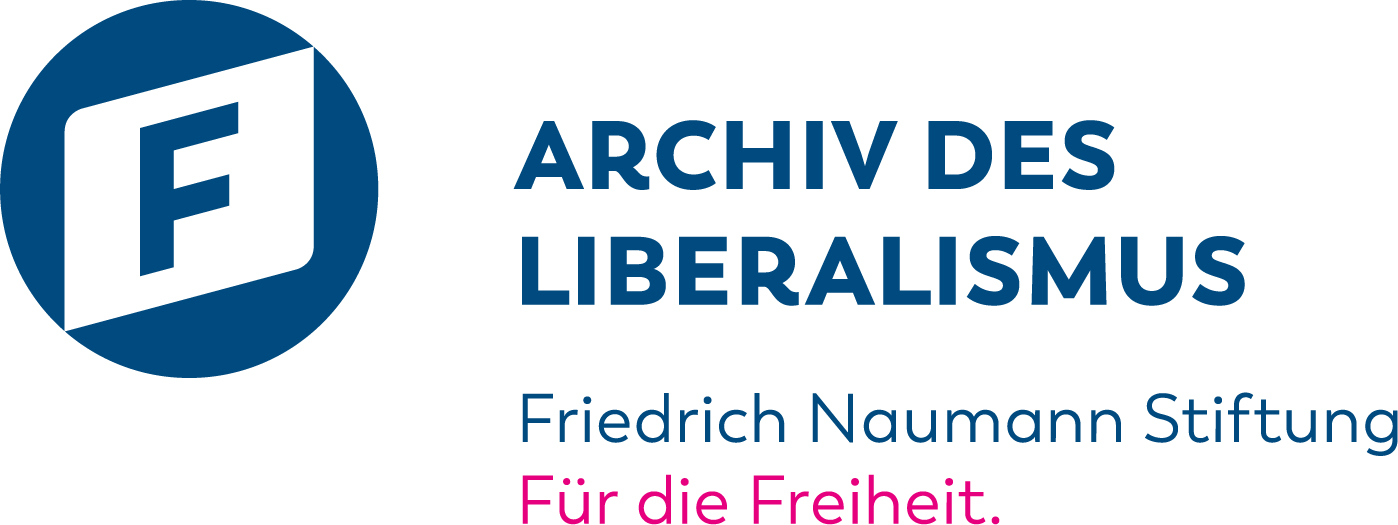
- Interactive map of Archive of Liberalism
- 51°0′18″N 7°34′7″E
- Location: Theodor-Heuss-Straße 26, Gummersbach, NRW, Germany
- Type: Institutional repository
- Established: 1968 (58 years ago)
- Affiliation: Friedrich Naumann Foundation
- Director: Ewald Grothe
- Period covered: 19th century – present
- Employees: 10

Building information
- Building: Theodor-Heuss-Akademie
- Website: www.freiheit.org/buero/archiv-des-liberalismus

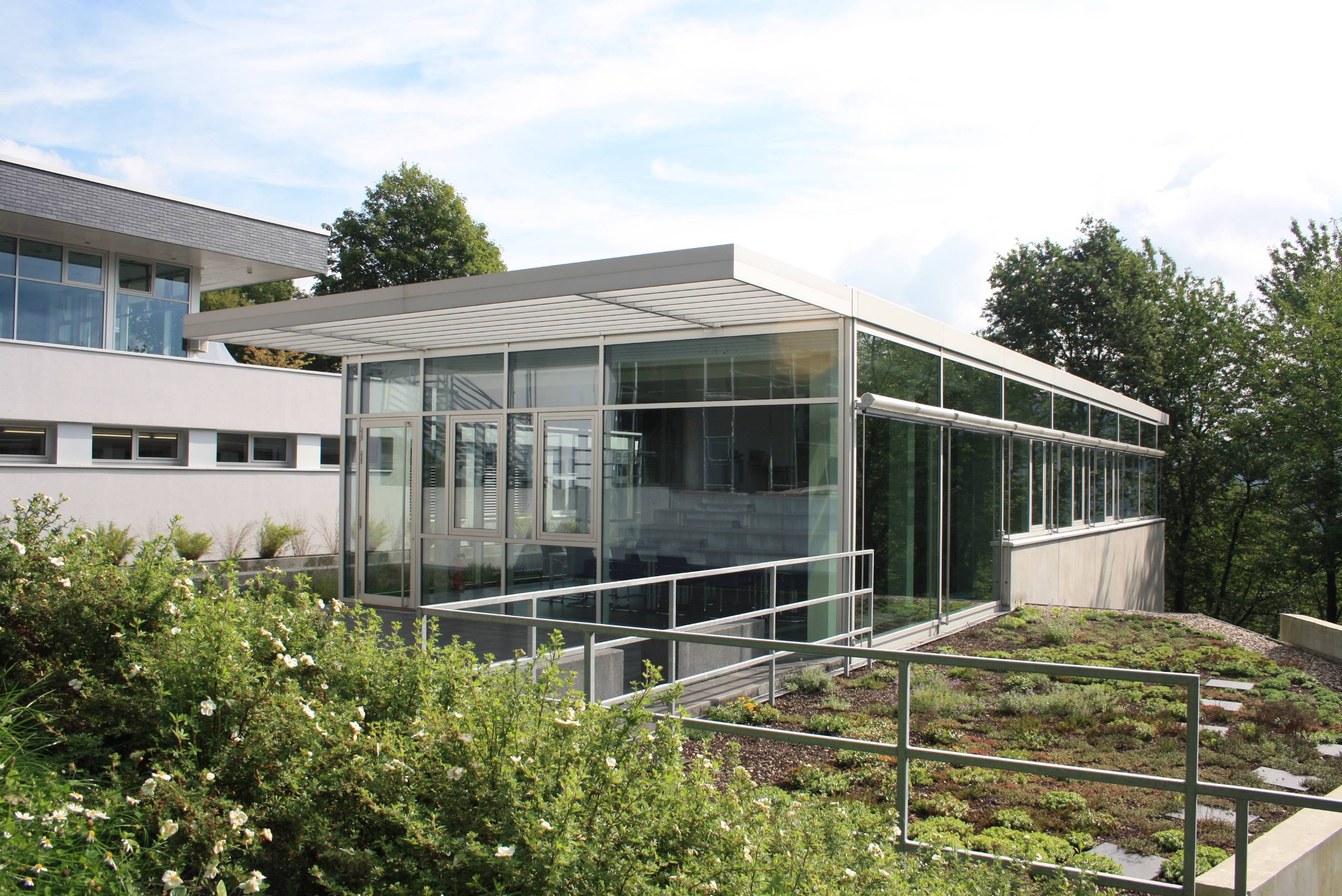
Building

The Archive of Liberalism (German: Archiv des Liberalismus) of the Friedrich Naumann Foundation for Freedom in Gummersbach, North Rhine-Westphalia, has been in existence since 1968 and is thus the oldest of the six archives of political foundations in Germany.

== Content ==
The Archive of Liberalism collects documents on the history of organized liberalism. In addition to "classical" file material, it also catalogues printed matter, leaflets, posters and other advertising material, as well as photos, films, videos, audio tapes and digital media (including websites). The focus of the collections is on Germany and the period after 1945; a few individual holdings date from the Weimar Republic, very few from the late 19th century. In total, the holdings comprise some 4.9 linear kilometres of files (as of 2020) and some 25,000 units of audiovisual material (posters, films, advertising material). The archive also includes a specialist scientific library with about 42,000 volumes (books, journals, printed matter, articles). The vast majority of the holdings are indexed in a database as well as in analogue or digital finding aids and are made available to users – in compliance with the terms of protection under the Federal Archives Act.

=== People ===
In addition, the archive holds the estates of liberal politicians, including former members of the Bundestag and federal chairmen of the FDP, such as those of the Federal Minister of the Interior and Foreign Affairs Hans-Dietrich Genscher, the Federal President and Federal Minister of Foreign Affairs Walter Scheel, the Federal Minister of Justice Thomas Dehler or the Federal Minister of Economics Otto Graf Lambsdorff, the long-standing chairman of the FDP parliamentary group Wolfgang Mischnick or the Vice-President of the German Bundestag Liselotte Funcke.

Further holdings can be found in the archives by the following personalities, among others:

- Franz Blücher, Federal Minister for Marshall Plan Affairs and Federal Minister for Economic Cooperation
- Dieter-Julius Cronenberg, long-time Vice President of the German Bundestag
- Johannes Dieckmann, President of the People's Chamber of the GDR (LDPD)
- Martha Dönhoff, German women's rights activist and liberal politician (DDP, FDP)
- Josef Ertl, Federal Minister of Food, Agriculture and Forestry
- Karl-Hermann Flach, Federal Executive Director and General Secretary of the FDP
- Hildegard Hamm-Brücher, State Secretary, Member of the Bundestag, Minister of State at the Federal Foreign Office
- Wilhelm Külz, politician (DDP, LDP), Reich Minister of the Interior, 1945 to 1948 Chairman of the LDP
- Reinhold Maier, first prime minister of Baden-Württemberg
- Hermann Saam, German diplomat and mayor
- Cornelia Schmalz-Jacobsen, Senator in Berlin, Secretary General of the FDP, Federal Government Commissioner for Foreigners
- Guido Westerwelle, Federal Chairman of the FDP and Federal Foreign Minister

== See also ==
- Archive for Christian Democratic Policy
