= Preflagellin peptidase =

Identifiers
- EC no.: 3.4.23.52

Databases
- IntEnz: IntEnz view
- BRENDA: BRENDA entry
- ExPASy: NiceZyme view
- KEGG: KEGG entry
- MetaCyc: metabolic pathway
- PRIAM: profile
- PDB structures: RCSB PDB PDBe PDBsum
Search
- PMC: articles
- PubMed: articles
- NCBI: proteins

Preflagellin peptidase (EC 3.4.23.52, designated FlaK) is an enzyme that catalyses the following chemical reaction:

Cleaves the signal peptide of 3 to 12 amino acids from the N-terminal of preflagellin, usually at Arg-Gly- or Lys-Gly-, to release flagellin.

This aspartic peptidase is present in Archaea.
