= Ememem =

French street artist

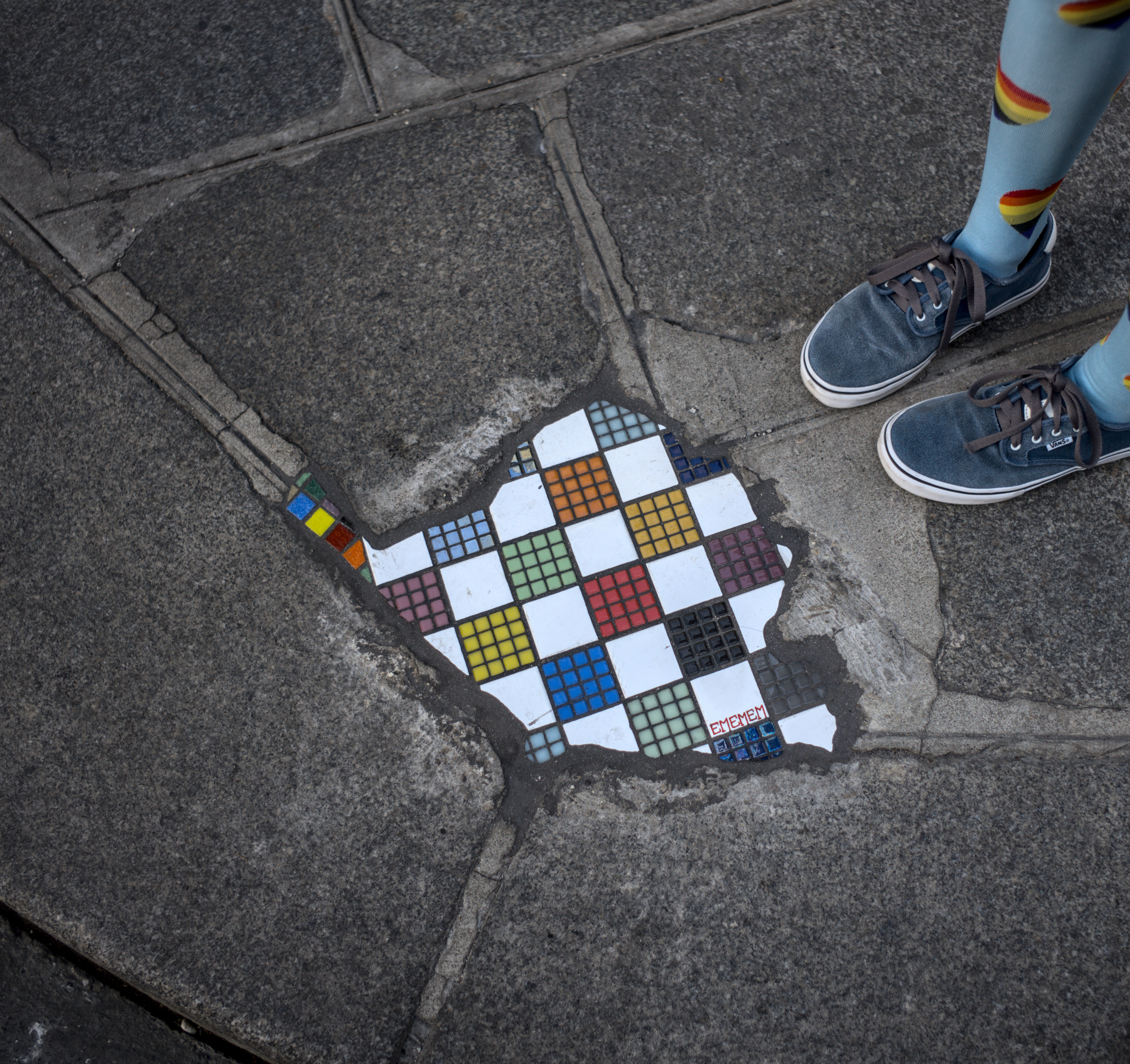
- A mosaic by Ememem
- Known for: Mosaics
- Style: Street art

Ememem is an anonymous French street artist based in Lyon. They (Note: Ememem's identity is unknown, and the artist has refused to share information such as age and gender. This article therefore uses they/them pronouns for the artist.) create mosaics incorporating geometric motifs in cracked sidewalks and façades, a process they call flacking. Ememem creates art at night, so that it is generally discovered at dawn.

== Art ==
A street artist, Ememem creates mosaics incorporating geometric motifs in cracked sidewalks and façades. They describe this art as "a poem that everybody can read" and "a memory notebook of the city". They created their first mosaic in 2011 in an alley in their hometown of Lyon, although they had already been working with ceramic; since 2016, they have created street mosaics across France, and as of September 2021 also in Barcelona (including in the Plaça Urquinaona and Sant Antoni) and Madrid as well as Turín, Genova, Civitacampomarano, and Terracina in Italy, Oslo, Hamar and Stavanger in Norway, Melbourne, Aberdeen in UK and Carlow in Ireland.

Their mosaics can easily be found in Lyon, and some visitors to the city seek them out. In 2021, Ememem was commissioned by the Société du Grand Paris to decorate the location of a new Grand Paris Express stop.

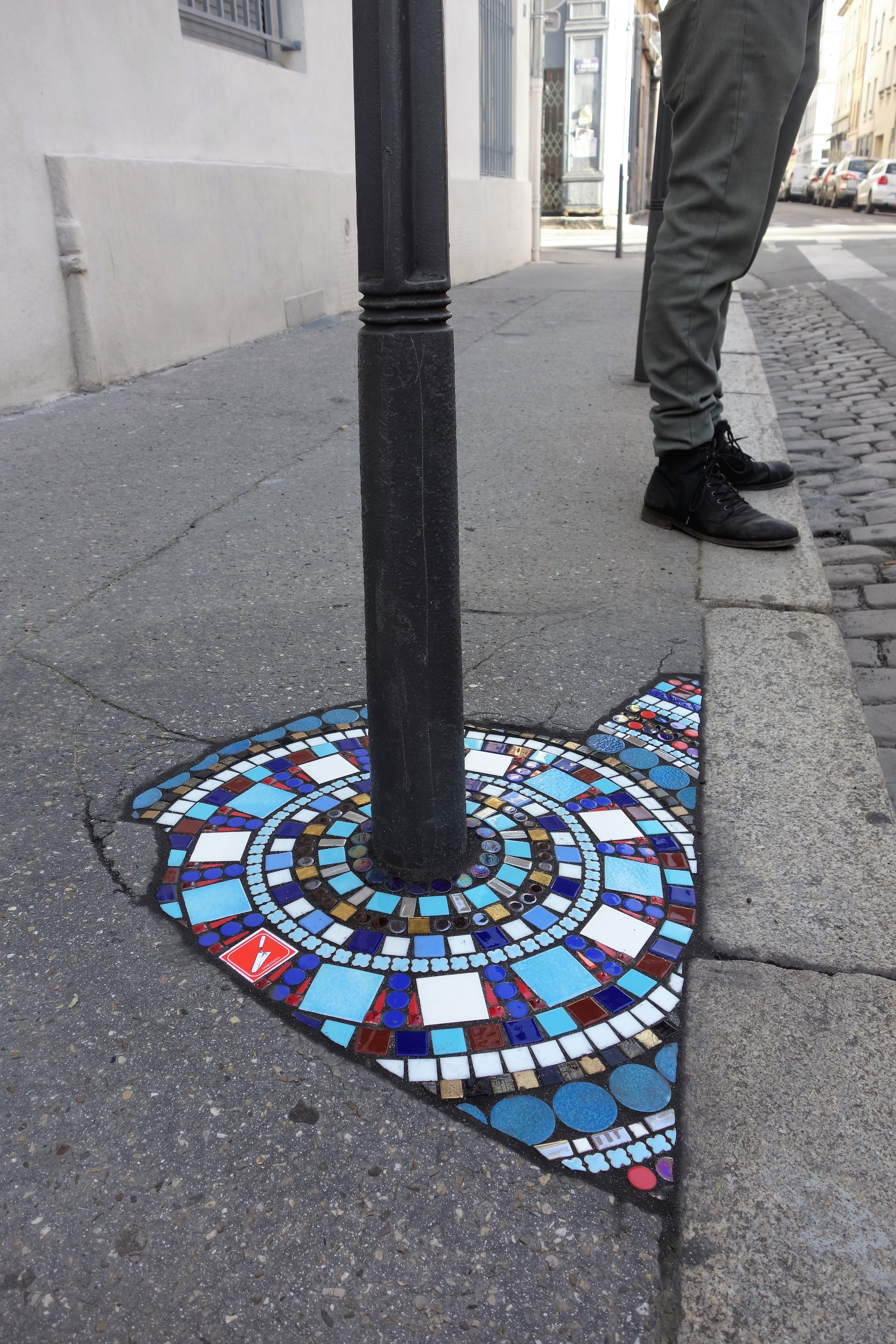
Mosaic by Ememem in Lyon

In addition to their street art, they have created additional commissions for exhibitions, some of which have been purchased by art collectors.

Ememem describes their art as flacking, a self-coined neologism derived from the French flaque, meaning "puddle" or "pool". They have cited Célébration du sol by Jean Dubuffet as an influence. Flacking, Ememem said, is "a free and low-tech repair process", and a way of transforming damaged urban spaces into "poetic spaces".

== Personal life ==
Ememem is French and lives in Lyon, where they are known as le chirurgien des trottoirs, "the pavement surgeon" or "the surgeon of the sidewalks". They told Ynet that the name "Ememem" refers to the sound of their moped, which they ride when they go to create a mosaic. They work at night to remain anonymous, and their identity is unknown; their work is generally found at dawn. They have refused requests for in-person or radio interviews, and declined to state their age or gender. They share images of their work on Instagram with the account "@ememem.flacking", which had more than 169,000 followers as of May 28, 2023.

== See also ==
- Jim Bachor
