= Little Flock =

Little Flock may refer to:

- Little Flock, Arkansas, a city in the United States
- Little Flock hymnbook, a collection of hymns used by the Exclusive Brethren
- Local churches (affiliation), a Christian group based on the teachings of Witness Lee and Watchman Nee
- The 144,000 "anointed ones" in the Jehovah's Witnesses' theology of salvation
