= The Flock (video game) =

2015 video game

- Developer: Vogelsap
- Platform: Windows
- Release: August 21, 2015
- Genre: Survival horror
- Mode: Multiplayer

The Flock is a survival horror video game developed by Vogelsap. It was released for Microsoft Windows on August 21, 2015. The game is multiplayer-only with a finite lifespan for all players. Poor financial performance of the game resulted in the servers being shut down without player deaths reaching the set limit.

== Gameplay ==
The Flock is an asymmetrical multiplayer video game that is played from a first-person perspective.

The player defeats enemies with light. Enemies have the ability to turn into statues and become invincible. Certain artifacts will give players special abilities, such as the ability to run faster, jump higher, and remain undetected. The game contains a mixture of action and stealth. The player's flashlight can give away their position to enemies. When players lose their lives in the game, the population of the game decreases. When all players die, the game's online portion is no longer functional and, according to the game's developer, the game will "never be purchasable again."

== Plot ==
The game starts with the player controlling a creature in a flock. They can find an artifact which will turn them into a human, although other monsters will try to steal the artifact.

== Development ==
The game was developed by the Dutch studio Vogelsap. It was first announced on May 30, 2013. The first trailer was unveiled on April 18, 2014.

== Reception ==
Reception

Aggregate score
Aggregator	Score
Metacritic	36/100

Review scores
Publication	Score
Destructoid	4/10
Hardcore Gamer	1.5/5
The Jimquisition	3/10

Based on five reviews, Metacritic gave The Flock an aggregated review score of 36 out of 100, indicating "generally unfavorable reviews".
