= Flak (video game) =

1984 video game

- Publishers: Funsoft, Inc. U.S. Gold
- Designer: Alain Marsily
- Programmers: Atari 8-bit Yves Lempereur; Apple II; Benoit Schillings; Commodore 64; Yves Lempereur; Troy Lyndon
- Platforms: Apple II, Atari 8-bit, Commodore 64, ZX Spectrum
- Release: 1984
- Genre: Scrolling shooter

Flak: The Ultimate Flight Experience is a vertically scrolling shooter for the Atari 8-bit computers designed by Alain Marsily, programmed by Yves Lempereur, and published by Funsoft in 1984. It was ported to the Apple II, Commodore 64, and ZX Spectrum home computers. Flak was heavily inspired by the 1982 Namco arcade video game Xevious. Most reviews were middling or harshly negative.

== Gameplay ==
The player flies a ship over a vertically scrolling landscape, firing on land bases, on the way to destroy a fortress containing an enemy CPU.

== Reception ==
The game received mixed to poor reviews. In ANALOG Computing, Steve Panak called Flak "the worst mistake your wallet ever made" and advised readers to "avoid it like radioactive waste", while Electronic Games called it "a challenging game that requires some almost impossibly fine maneuvering". Your Spectrum called the game a rip-off of Xevious and gave a score of 0.8/5.

Commodore User was more lenient, giving the game a 3/5 in "value for money" and praising the presentation, though complaining about excessive difficulty, disappointing sound, and long load times. Writing for TV Gamer, J.P. Thompson praised the Commodore 64 version's "ultra-smooth scrolling" and called it "a truly addictive game". The review, which gave it a 3.5/5, cited the game's difficulty as something that would have players "staying up most of the night attempting to reach [its] penultimate phase". Contrary to other contemporary reviews, Personal Computer Games remarked that the Atari 8-bit version is "too easy" and therefore "lacks any truly addictive qualities", giving it a 6/10.
