= Jakob Flach =

Swiss painter (1894–1982)

- Born: 26 March 1894; Winterthur, Switzerland
- Died: 30 September 1982 (aged 88); Locarno, Switzerland
- Occupations: Writer, puppeteer, painter, theatre director
- Spouse: Katharina Früeh

Jakob Flach (26 March 1894 – 30 September 1982) was a Swiss writer, puppeteer, painter and theatre director. Considered a pioneer of string puppetry in Switzerland, he founded the Marionette Theatre of Ascona in 1937 and led it until 1960.

== Biography ==
Jakob Flach was born on 26 March 1894 in Winterthur. From 1910 to 1919, he was active in the Wandervogel movement. He studied botany and geology at ETH Zurich but left the programme in 1917, later qualifying as a primary-school teacher in 1919 before pursuing an artistic life.

Flach lived mainly in Ticino while making extended journeys through Europe and travelling to the Middle East, Africa and India. He maintained contacts with artists, musicians and writers, including Hermann Hesse. In 1921–1922, he worked as caretaker of Emil Ludwig's villa. In 1925, he settled in an old mill between Ronco and Arcegno. Flach kept 83 diaries over nearly 30 years, from 1910 to 1940. The diaries record his travels and everyday experiences and include numerous drawings and occasional photographs. The outbreak of the Second World War brought his long period of extensive travel to an end.

In 1959, Flach received an honorary award from the city of Winterthur for his body of work. In 1969, he was made an honorary member of UNIMA in Prague. In 1974, Flach married Katharina Früeh. He died in Locarno on 30 September 1982.

== Work ==
Flach worked as a painter, stage designer, director and writer, and also produced drawings and illustrations. From 1928, Flach worked as a director at the Swiss Marionette Theatre in Zurich. In 1937, he founded the Marionette Theatre of Ascona, which he led until 1960. He carved puppets for the theatre and wrote and directed his own plays, while also staging works by other authors. Flach opposed combining human performers with puppets. He wrote 40 puppet plays for the theatre.

Flach is considered a pioneer of string puppetry in Switzerland. His puppets were characterized by disproportionately large heads and hands, which heightened their expressiveness. Over its 24-year existence, the Marionette Theatre of Ascona presented about 60 original productions and more than 750 performances. Nearly 150 puppeteers worked on the theatre's productions. The theatre closed in 1961.

Flach's fiction and nonfiction included the novel Brautfahrt ohne Ende (1959), Blühender Zweig (1964), and Das schwarze Afrika für Anfänger (1965). He also wrote Minestra: Dank für Rebhuhn, Schwein und Spargel (1937), a cookbook interwoven with stories and anecdotes. A fifth edition appeared in 1952. In 1960, he published Ascona, a work reflecting on the Marionette Theatre of Ascona.

== Legacy ==
Flach's literary estate was donated to the Swiss Literary Archives in Bern in 1993. Puppets from his theatre are held by the Swiss Theatre Collection in Bern and the Puppentheatermuseum of the Munich Stadtmuseum.
