= Geoffroi Jacques Flach =

French jurist and historian (1846–1919)

Geoffroi Jacques Flach (February 16, 1846 – December 4, 1919) was a French jurist and historian born at Strasbourg, Alsace, of a family known at least as early as the 16th century, when Sigismond Flach was the first professor of law at University of Strasbourg.

G.J. Flach studied classics and law at Strasbourg, and in 1869 took his degree of doctor of law. In his theses as well as in his early writings such as De la subrogation réelle, La Bonorum possessio, and Sur la durée des effets de la minorité (1870) he endeavored to explain the problems of laws by means of history, an idea which was new to France at that time. The Franco-Prussian War engaged Flach's activities in other directions, and he spent two years (described in his Strasbourg après le bombardment, 1873) at work on the rebuilding of the library and the museum, which had been destroyed by Prussian shells.

When the time came for him to choose between Germany and France, he settled definitely in Paris, where he completed his scientific training at the École des Chartes and the École des Hautes Études. Having acted for some time as secretary to Jules Sénard, ex-president of the Constituent Assembly, he published an original paper on artistic copyright, but as soon as possible resumed the history of law. In 1879 he became assistant to the jurist Édouard René de Laboulaye at the Collège de France, and succeeded him in 1884 in the chair of comparative legislation.

Since 1877 he had been professor of comparative law at the free school of the political sciences. To qualify himself for these two positions he had to study the most diverse civilizations, including those of the East and Far East (e.g. Hungary, Russia and Japan) and even the antiquities of Babylonia and other Asiatic countries. Some of his lectures have been published, particularly those concerning Ireland: Histoire du régime agraire de l'Irlande (1883); Considérations sur l'histoire politique de l'Irlande (1885); and Jonathan Swift, son action politique en Irlande (1886).

His chief efforts, however, were concentrated on the history of ancient French law. A celebrated lawsuit in Alsace, pleaded by his friend and compatriot Ignace Chauffour, aroused his interest by reviving the question of the origin of the feudal laws, and gradually led him to study the formation of those laws and the early growth of the feudal system. His great work, Les Origines de l'ancienne France, was produced slowly. In the first volume, Le Régime seigneurial (1886), he depicts the triumph of individualism and anarchy, showing how, after Charlemagne's great but sterile efforts to restore the Roman principle of sovereignty, the great landowners gradually monopolized the various functions in the state; how society modelled on antiquity disappeared; and how the only living organisms were vassalage and clientship.

The second volume, Les Origines communales, et féodalité et la chevalerie (1893), deals with the reconstruction of society on new bases which took place in the 10th and 11th centuries. It explains how the Gallo-Roman villa gave place to the village, with its fortified castle, the residence of the lord; how new towns were formed by the side of old, some of which disappeared; how the townspeople united in corporations; and how the communal bond proved to be a powerful instrument of cohesion. At the same time it traces the birth of feudalism from the germs of the Gallo-Roman personal comitalus; and shows how the bond that united the different parties was the contract of the fief; and how, after a slow growth of three centuries, feudalism was definitely organized in the 12th century.

In 1904 appeared the third volume, La Renaissance de l'État, in which the author describes the efforts of the Direct Capetian kings to reconstruct the power of the Frankish kings over the whole of Gaul; and goes on to show how the clergy, the heirs of the imperial tradition, encouraged this ambition; how the great lords of the kingdom (the "princes", as Flach calls them), whether as allies or foes, pursued the same end; and how, before the close of the 12th century, the Capetian kings were in possession of the organs and the means of action which were to render them so powerful and bring about the early downfall of feudalism.

In these three volumes, which appeared at long intervals, the author's theories are not always in complete harmony, nor are they always presented in a very luminous or coherent manner, but they are marked by originality and vigour. Flach gave them a solid basis by the wide range of his researches, utilizing charters and cartularies (published and unpublished), chronicles, lives of saints, and even those dangerous guides, the chansons de geste.

He owed little to the historians of feudalism, who knew what feudalism was, but not how it came about. He pursued the same method in his L'Origine de l'habitation et des lieux habités en France (1899), in which he discusses some of the theories circulated by A Meitzen in Germany and by Arbois de Jubainville in France. Following in the footsteps of the jurist F. K. von Savigny, Flach studied the teaching of law in the Middle Ages and the Renaissance, and produced Cujas les glossateurs et les Bartolistes (1883), and Études critiques sur l'histoire du droit romain au moyen âge, avec textes inédits (1890).

Flach's library was purchased by the University of Missouri in 1920 and is preserved at the University of Missouri Libraries.
