= Frank Kolb =

German historian (1945–2026)

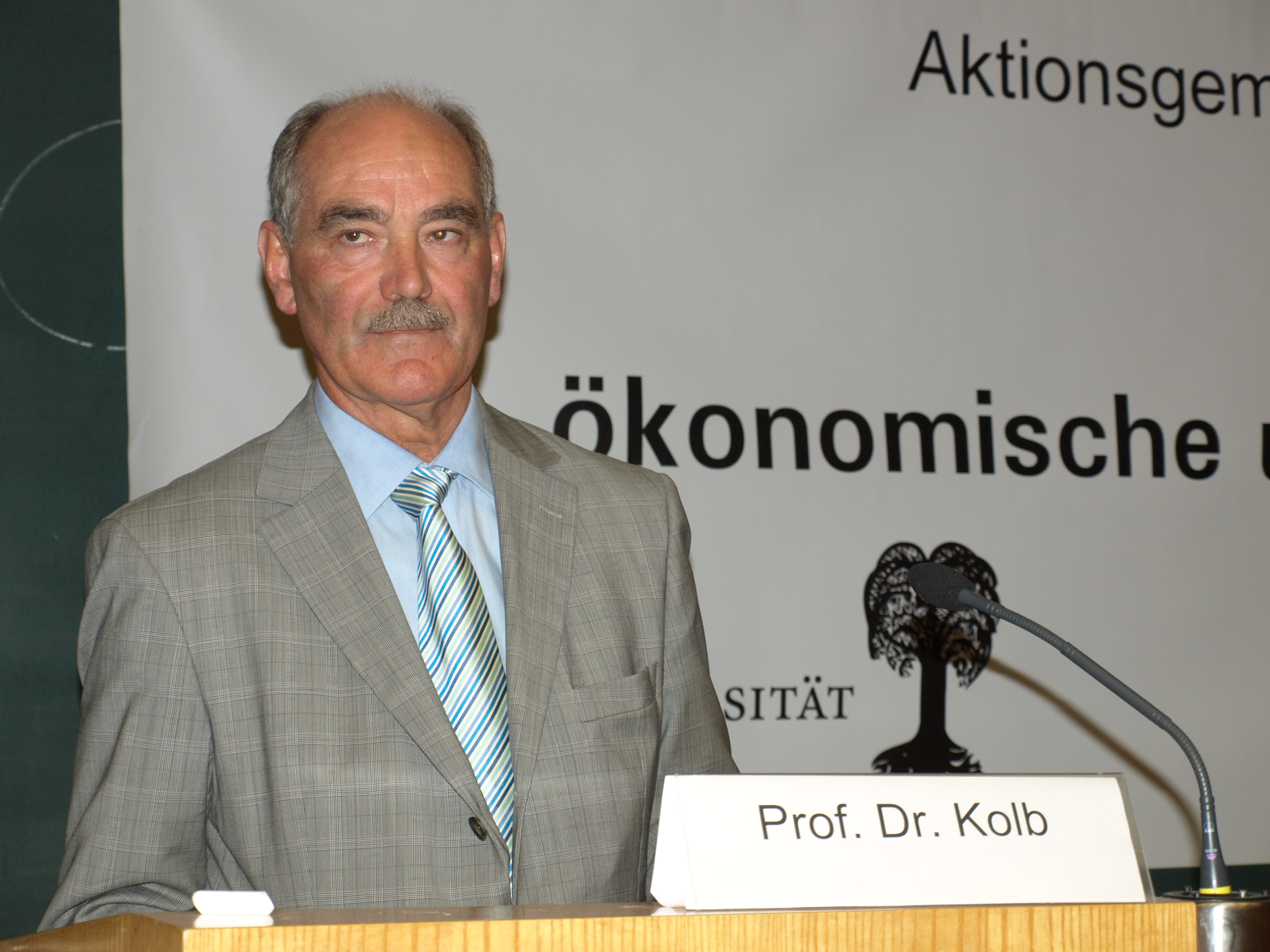
Kolb in 2008

Frank Kolb (27 February 1945 – 18 January 2026) was a German historian who was a professor of ancient history at the University of Tübingen in Germany. He was involved in a controversy over findings concerning the late Bronze Age in Troy, and in 2001 accused Manfred Korfmann, the professor at Tübingen who had been leading excavations at the archaeological site of Troy since 1988, of deliberately misrepresenting his findings there. Kolb believed Troy was not an important city, but Korfmann (and others) had suggested that it was a significant trade centre. A subsequent two-day conference at the university in February 2002, attended by more than 800 people, with a subsequent long reassessment of Korfmann's evidence by Bronze Age specialists supported Korfmann's findings. Kolb continued to disagree.

Kolb was born in Rheinbach, Gau Cologne-Aachen on 27 February 1945, and died on 18 January 2026, at the age of 80.
