= Igor Flach =

German musician (1966–2008)

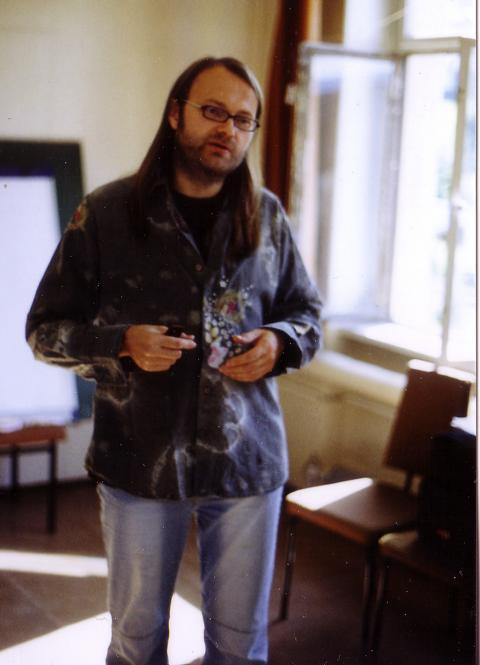
Igor Flach in 2004.

Igor Flach (12 March 1966 in Jena, East Germany – 8 March 2008 in Berlin, Germany) was a German musician and harmonica virtuoso, considered by many to be one of the most gifted harmonica players ever.

He was originally drawn to blues, but later defied any attempt to pigeonhole him into any specific genre as he experimented with folk (such as African, Greek and Russian styles) and country music. Flach incorporated all that into an unorthodox, hypnotic rhythm.

He learned to play harmonica at the age of 10 and was inspired by Stefan Diestelmann and the French Bluesharp player Jean Jacques Milteau.

He launched his professional career in 1984 with the Jonathan Blues Band. From 1987 to 1989, he played with Passat and appeared as a guest musician with Pankow and the Tino Standhaft Band.

In the 1990s, Flach began a solo career and toured the United States, France and Russia. He made guest appearances on several recordings of the period, including the Yardbirds, Alicia Levy, Louisiana Red, The Uwe-Ochsenknecht Band, Abi Wallenstein, Buzz Dee, Rudi Howard and Guitar Crusher. With Stefan Strahl, he created a German-language Neil Young cover band. Until his death, he was a part of an intensive cooperation with Uwe Bluesrudi Haase as the “Igor flat & Bluesman Rudi" duo.

Flach made six solo albums between 1994 and 2004 and was a part of the “Harmonica Live” music festival in Klingenthal, Germany and operated Harpshop.com.

== Personal life and death ==
He was the father of two daughters.

Flach died in the intensive care unit of the Berlin Cardiology Center following a difficult heart operation. He died only a few days before his 42nd birthday.
