= Hugh Flack =

Irish footballer (1903–1986)

Personal information
- Full name: Hugh David Flack
- Date of birth: 26 April 1903
- Place of birth: Belfast, Ireland
- Date of death: 18 June 1986 (aged 83)
- Position: Full back

Senior career*
Years	Team	Apps	(Gls)
1922–1927	Crusaders		
1927–1929	Burnley	3	(0)
1929–1930	Swansea Town	0	(0)
1930–1932	Distillery		
1932–1934	Halifax Town	74	(0)
1932–1934	Portadon		

International career
1929	Ireland	1	(0)
- * Club domestic league appearances and goals

Hugh David Flack (26 April 1903 – 18 June 1986) was an Irish professional footballer who played as a full back. He played for a number of teams in Ireland and England and won one cap for the Ireland national team.

== Early life ==
Flack was born in Belfast on 26 April 1903.

Before turning professional in 1924, Flack made a living a shipyard worker in Belfast. He continued to work on the shipyard until he moved to England in 1927.

== Club career ==
Flack began his career playing at Intermediate level for Linfield Rangers in 1922. Later that year, he joined Crusaders. He took part in the 1922 Steel & Sons Cup final which Crusaders won 3–1 after 20 minutes of extra time in a second replay against Bangor. In a successful spell at Crusaders, Flack helped the team to the Intermediate League title in 1922–23, the Steel & Sons cup and Intermediate Cup in 1926.

In 1927, Flack made the move to England to play in the Football League when he signed for Burnley. In his first season, he was limited to playing in the reserves but was promoted to the first team in February 1929 and made his first team debut in the Football League First Division a 0–0 draw with Bury on 18 February. Flack made two more appearances for Burnley before he was sold to Football League Second Division side Swansea Town for £500 in May 1929.

Flack did not make a first team appearance for Swansea Town and was placed on the transfer list in December 1929. His contract was not renewed at the end of the season.

He returned to Belfast in 1930 and joined Distillery where he helped the team win the Belfast Charity Cup in May 1931.

Flack returned to English football in October 1932 when he joined Halifax Town on trial. He quickly impressed and, after a temporary extension of the trial period, he was signed permanently by the Football League Third Division North club at the beginning of December.

== International career ==
Flack made his only appearance for Ireland in a 7–3 defeat to Scotland on 23 February 1929 at Windsor Park, Belfast.

== Death ==
Flack died on 18 June 1986.
