= Barry Flick =

English cricketer (born 1952)

Personal information
- Full name: Barry John Flick
- Born: 5 March 1952 (age 74); Coventry, Warwickshire, England
- Batting: Right-handed
- Role: Wicket-keeper

Domestic team information
- Years: Team
- 1969–1973: Warwickshire

Career statistics
Competition	First-class	List A
Matches	16	6
Runs scored	46	7
Batting average	7.66	7.00
100s/50s	–/–	–/–
Top score	18	4*
Balls bowled	–	–
Wickets	–	–
Bowling average	–	–
5 wickets in innings	–	–
10 wickets in match	–	–
Best bowling	–	–
Catches/stumpings	17/4	2/–
- Source: Cricinfo, 22 December 2011

Barry John Flick (born 5 March 1952) is a former English cricketer. Flick was a right-handed batsman who fielded as a wicket-keeper. He was born at Coventry, Warwickshire.

Flick made his first-class debut for Warwickshire against Cambridge University in 1969. He made fifteen further first-class appearances for the county, the last of which came against Gloucestershire in the 1973 County Championship. In his sixteen first-class matches, he scored a total of 46 runs at an average of 7.66, with a high score of 18. Behind the stumps he took 17 catches and made 4 stumpings. He made his List A debut for Warwickshire in the 1971 John Player League against Gloucestershire. He made four further List A appearances in that season's competition, before next playing in that format in the 1973 John Player League against Lancashire. In his six List A matches, he scored just 7 runs with a high score of 4 not out.

His brother, Clayton Flick, was one of the victims of the terrorist bombing of Pan Am flight 103 over Lockerbie in 1988.
