= Elizabeth Flock =

American journalist and author

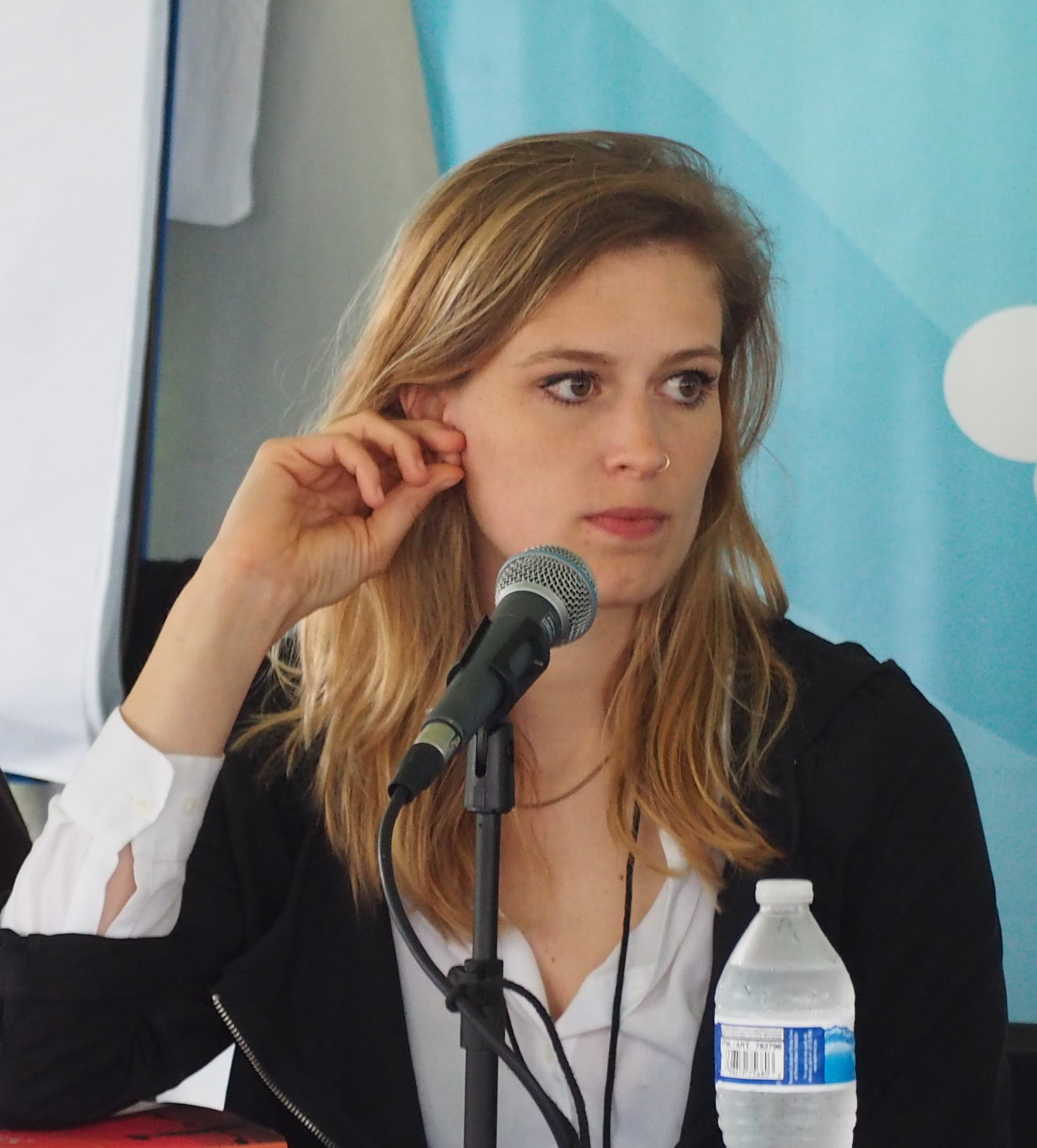
- Born: Chicago, Illinois
- Education: Boston College; New York University
- Occupations: Journalist, author

Elizabeth Flock is an American journalist and author. She formerly worked as a reporter and producer for PBS NewsHour. Flock's reporting has focused on gender, justice, and social issues.

== Life and career ==
Flock studied English at Boston College, graduating with a Bachelor of Arts in 2008. She later earned a certificate in documentary film at the George Washington University in 2013 and completed a master's degree in Literary Reportage at New York University through the Arthur L. Carter Journalism Institute.

In 2008, Flock joined Forbes India, where she worked for two years as a features and investigative reporter. From 2010 to 2012, she covered foreign and breaking news for U.S. News & World Report and The Washington Post.

From 2017 to 2019, Flock worked at PBS NewsHour as a reporter and producer, contributing to its books coverage, including the "Now Read This" series. At NewsHour, she also investigated and reported on sexual harassment in the U.S. Forest Service.

In 2018, Flock published The Heart Is a Shifting Sea: Love and Marriage in Mumbai, a nonfiction book that follows three Mumbai couples over more than a decade and examines marriage amid social and cultural change. Flock published her second book, The Furies: Women, Vengeance, and Justice, in 2024, about three women who fought back in self-defense and the aftermath.

In 2022, she served as executive producer of the Netflix documentary State of Alabama vs. Brittany Smith. Flock hosts the podcast Blind Plea, a series about self-defense through the lens of one woman's case.
