= Jens Hacke =

German political scientist (born 1973)

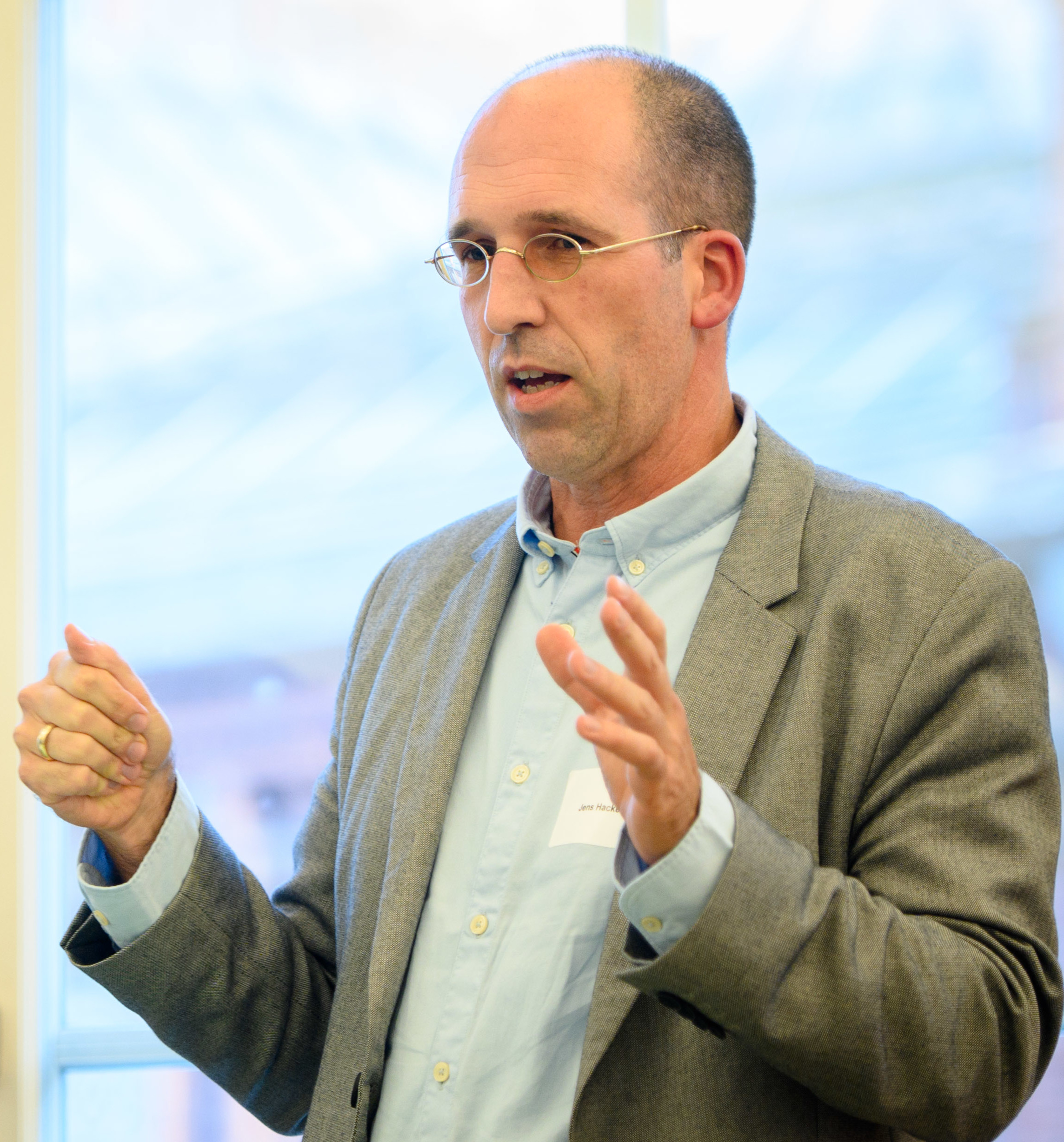
Jens Hacke, 2019

Jens Hacke (born 6 December 1973) is a German political scientist and author.

== Life ==
Born in Bonn, Hacke was born in 1973 as the son of the political scientist Christian Hacke in Bonn. He studied ancient, modern and contemporary history as well as political science and philosophy Die deutsche Rechte und die Revolution. Ein Beitrag zur Ideengeschichte des Nationalsozialismus und der "Konservativen Revolution". Subsequently, Hacke was a research assistant in the "Theorie der Politik" department of the "Politikwissenschaft Online" project funded by the Bundesministerium für Bildung und Forschung until 2003 and a research assistant at the Institute for Social Sciences at the Humboldt University until 2008. In 2005, Hacke was awarded a doctorate in political science under the direction of Herfried Münkler. In 2007, he took on a teaching position at the Institute for Political Science of the University of Hamburg. From 2008 to 2016, he was a research assistant at the Hamburg Institute for Social Research. From 2016 to 2018, he held a chair for political science at the Martin Luther University of Halle-Wittenberg; in 2018/19, he taught as a professorial assistant at the University of Greifswald.

Hacke's dissertation Philosophy of Citizenship, which was published in a second edition in 2008, was awarded the Wolf-Erich-Kellner-Preis and the Friedwart Bruckhaus-Förderpreis of the Hanns Martin Schleyer Foundation. Andreas Rödder discussed the dissertation in the Frankfurter Allgemeine Zeitung and emphasised that it is a "classical history of ideas in its best, reflected sense, whose potential for knowledge Hacke impressively demonstrates in practical application".

Hacke is a member of the board of trustees of the Wolf-Erich-Kellner-Gedächtnisstiftung for the award of the Wolf-Erich-Kellner-Prize and a member of the advisory board of the Stiftung Bundespräsident-Theodor-Heuss-Haus in Stuttgart.

Since August 2020, Hacke has been teaching at the University of the Bundeswehr Munich.

== Audios ==
- Die symbolpolitische Flanke ist offen., Jens Hacke über die Reichsflagge, Gespräch mit Mascha Drost, Deutschlandfunk Kultur heute, 30 August 2020, 6.27 Minuten, Textversion: "Symbolpolitische Flanke ist offen"

== Publications ==
Author

- Philosophie der Bürgerlichkeit. Vandenhoeck & Ruprecht, Göttingen 2006 (zugleich: Humboldt-Universität, Diss., 2005), ISBN 978-3-525-36842-8.
- Die Bundesrepublik als Idee. Zur Legitimationsbedürftigkeit politischer Ordnung. Hamburger Edition, Hamburg 2009, ISBN 978-3-86854-214-1.
- Existenzkrise der Demokratie. Zur politischen Theorie des Liberalismus in der Zwischenkriegszeit. Suhrkamp, Berlin 2018 (zugleich: Humboldt-Universität, Habilitationsschrift, 2017), ISBN 978-3-518-29850-3.

Publisher

- with Dominik Geppert: Streit um den Staat. Intellektuelle Debatten in der Bundesrepublik 1960–1980. Vandenhoeck & Ruprecht, Göttingen 2008, ISBN 978-3-525-36758-2.
- with Matthias Pohlig: Theorie in der Geschichtswissenschaft. Einblicke in die Praxis des historischen Forschens. Campus, Frankfurt, 2008, ISBN 978-3-593-38662-1.
- with Herfried Münkler: Strategien der Visualisierung. Verbildlichung als Mittel politischer Kommunikation. Campus, Frankfurt, 2009, ISBN 978-3-593-38895-3.
- with Herfried Münkler: Wege in die neue Bundesrepublik. Politische Mythen und kollektive Selbstbilder nach 1989. Campus, Frankfurt, 2009, ISBN 978-3-593-38896-0.
- Moritz Julius Bonn – Zur Krise der Demokratie. Politische Schriften in der Weimarer Republik 1919–1932. Walter de Gruyter, Berlin/Boston 2015, ISBN 978-3-05-006259-4.
- with Ewald Grothe: Liberales Denken in der Krise der Weltkriegsepoche. Moritz Julius Bonn. Steiner, Stuttgart 2018, ISBN 978-3-515-12234-4.
