= Fluck =

Fluck is a surname. Notable people with the surname include:

- Diana Mary Fluck, stage name Diana Dors (1931–1984), English actress and singer
- Hannah Fluck, British archaeologist
- Henry K. Fluck (1912–1989), US Army major general
- Peter Fluck (1941–2026), British caricaturist
- Winfried Fluck, German academic

== See also ==
- Flack (disambiguation)
- Fuck
