= Fleck =

Fleck is a surname. Notable people with the surname include:

- Abbey Fleck, American inventor, Makin' Bacon
- Alexander Fleck (1889–1968), British chemist
- Ann Davison Duffie Fleck (1923–2018), American civic leader and musician
- Béla Fleck (born 1958), American banjo player
- Bob Fleck (1932–2017), American college football player
- Claude Fleck (1889–1962), Australian politician
- Daniel Fleck (1949–2011), American politician from Pennsylvania
- Fred Fleck (1892–1961), American assistant director
- Hans-Georg Fleck (born 1953), German historian
- Jack Fleck (1921–2014), American golfer
- Jacob Fleck (1881–1953), Austrian film director
- James Fleck (born 1931), Canadian businessman and academic
- Jerry Fleck (1947–2003), American assistant director
- Johannes Fleck (1559–1628), German Lutheran theologian
- John Fleck (actor) (born 1951), American actor
- John Fleck (footballer) (born 1991), Scottish footballer
- Joseph Fleck (1892–1977), American painter and muralist
- Jutta Fleck (born 1946), German activist
- Konrad Fleck, 13th-century German poet
- Leonard M. Fleck (born 1944), American philosopher and medical ethicist
- Ludwik Fleck (1896–1961), Polish scientist and sociologist of science
- Luise Fleck (1873–1950), Austrian film director
- Mike Fleck (born 1973), American politician from Pennsylvania
- Norman Fleck (born 1958), British scientist and engineer
- P. J. Fleck (born 1980), American football player and coach
- Polly Fleck (1933–2019), Canadian poet
- Robbie Fleck (born 1975), South African rugby player
- Robert Fleck (born 1965), Scottish footballer
- Ryan Fleck (born 1976), American film director
- Stephen Fleck (1912–2002), American psychiatrist
- Zoe Fleck (born 2000), American volleyball player

Fictional characters:

- Arthur Fleck, protagonist of Joker (2019) by Todd Phillips
- Kernel Fleck, protagonist in The Demonata series of books by Darren Shan

== See also ==
- Baron Fleck, a peerage of the United Kingdom
