= Athletics at the 1957 World University Games – Men's 100 metres =

The men's 100 metres event at the 1957 World University Games was held at the Stadium Charlety in Paris on 5 and 6 September 1957.

== Medalists ==
| Gold | Silver | Bronze |
|---|---|---|
| Manfred Germar; West Germany | Ira Murchison; United States | Leonid Bartenyev; Soviet Union |

== Results ==
=== Heats ===
| Rank | Heat | Athlete | Nationality | Time | Notes |
|---|---|---|---|---|---|
| 1 | 1 | Ira Murchison | United States | 10.8 | Q |
| 2 | 1 | Klaus Förster | West Germany | 11.1 | Q |
| 3 | 1 | Jeffrey | Great Britain | 11.2 | Q |
| 4 | 1 | Francisco Kadlec | Brazil | 11.4 | |
| 5 | 1 | Takayama | Japan | 11.4 | |
| 1 | 2 | Manfred Germar | West Germany | 11.4 | Q |
| 2 | 2 | Pier Giorgio Cazzola | Italy | 11.4 | Q |
| 3 | 2 | Tavares | Brazil | 11.7 | Q |
| 4 | 2 | Wojciech Czajkowski | Poland | 11.8 | |
| 1 | 3 | Leonid Bartenyev | Soviet Union | 11.1 | Q |
| 2 | 3 | Takeo Tamura | Japan | 11.2 | Q |
| 3 | 3 | Mircea Pop | Romania | 11.3 | Q |
| 4 | 3 | Armando Roca | Spain | 11.3 | |
| 5 | 3 | Gerald Mason | Ireland | 11.5 | |
| 1 | 4 | Jacques Vercruysse | Belgium | 11.4 | Q |
| 2 | 4 | Jaime López Amor | Spain | 11.4 | Q |
| 3 | 4 | Mieczysław Borek | Poland | 11.5 | Q |
| 4 | 4 | Jean-Félix Rousset | France | 11.6 | |
| 1 | 5 | Vladilyen Marin | Soviet Union | 11.3 | Q |
| 2 | 5 | Dieter Kröger | West Germany | 11.4 | Q |
| 3 | 5 | Ketmetto | Lebanon | 11.7 | Q |
| 4 | 5 | Jim Railton | Great Britain | 11.9 | |
| 1 | 6 | Joël Caprice | France | 11.1 | Q |
| 2 | 6 | Zdzisław Szczepański | Poland | 11.2 | Q |
| 3 | 6 | Michele Boccardo | Italy | 11.4 | Q |
| 4 | 6 | Francis | Bermuda | 11.4 | |
| 1 | 7 | Sándor Jakabfy | Hungary | 11.2 | Q |
| 2 | 7 | Nick Whitehead | Great Britain | 11.3 | Q |
| 3 | 7 | Ilarie Măgdaş | Romania | 11.3 | Q |
| 4 | 7 | Myata | Japan | 11.6 | |
| 5 | 7 | Melanio Asensio | Spain | 11.6 | |
| 1 | 8 | Albert Plaskeyev | Soviet Union | 11.2 | Q |
| 2 | 8 | Klaus Gump | Austria | 11.3 | Q |
| 3 | 8 | Ciardello | Italy | 11.5 | Q |
| 4 | 8 | Silva | Brazil | 11.6 | |
| 5 | 8 | Vladimír Šimeček | Czechoslovakia | 11.6 | |

=== Quarterfinals ===
| Rank | Heat | Athlete | Nationality | Time | Notes |
|---|---|---|---|---|---|
| 1 | 1 | Ira Murchison | United States | 10.8 | Q |
| 2 | 1 | Vladilyen Marin | Soviet Union | 11.0 | Q |
| 3 | 1 | Ciardello | Italy | 11.0 | Q |
| 4 | 1 | Nick Whitehead | Great Britain | 11.1 | |
| 5 | 1 | Mircea Pop | Romania | 11.1 | |
| 6 | 1 | Tavares | Brazil | 11.4 | |
| 1 | 2 | Leonid Bartenyev | Soviet Union | 10.8 | Q |
| 2 | 2 | Zdzisław Szczepański | Poland | 11.0 | Q |
| 3 | 2 | Klaus Gump | Austria | 11.0 | Q |
| 4 | 2 | Dieter Kröger | West Germany | 11.1 | |
| 5 | 2 | Jacques Vercruysse | Belgium | 11.2 | |
| | 2 | Ketmetto | Lebanon | ? | |
| 1 | 3 | Joël Caprice | France | 11.0 | Q |
| 2 | 3 | Albert Plaskeyev | Soviet Union | 11.1 | Q |
| 3 | 3 | Klaus Förster | West Germany | 11.2 | Q |
| 4 | 3 | Ilarie Măgdaş | Romania | 11.4 | |
| 5 | 3 | Pier Giorgio Cazzola | Italy | 11.4 | |
| 6 | 3 | Mieczysław Borek | Poland | 11.6 | |
| 1 | 4 | Manfred Germar | West Germany | 10.9 | Q |
| 2 | 4 | Sándor Jakabfy | Hungary | 11.0 | Q |
| 3 | 4 | Michele Boccardo | Italy | 11.1 | Q |
| 4 | 4 | Jeffrey | Great Britain | 11.2 | |
| 5 | 4 | Jaime López Amor | Spain | 11.5 | |
| 6 | 4 | Takeo Tamura | Japan | 11.5 | |

=== Semifinals ===
| Rank | Heat | Athlete | Nationality | Time | Notes |
|---|---|---|---|---|---|
| 1 | 1 | Ira Murchison | United States | 10.8 | Q |
| 2 | 1 | Leonid Bartenyev | Soviet Union | 10.8 | Q |
| 3 | 1 | Sándor Jakabfy | Hungary | 10.9 | Q |
| 4 | 1 | Klaus Förster | West Germany | 11.0 | |
| 5 | 1 | Vladilyen Marin | Soviet Union | 11.0 | |
| 6 | 1 | Michele Boccardo | Italy | 11.0 | |
| 1 | 2 | Manfred Germar | West Germany | 10.7 | Q |
| 2 | 2 | Joël Caprice | France | 10.7 | Q |
| 3 | 2 | Zdzisław Szczepański | Poland | 11.0 | Q |
| 4 | 2 | Albert Plaskeyev | Soviet Union | 11.0 | |
| 5 | 2 | Ciardello | Italy | 11.1 | |
| | 2 | Klaus Gump | Austria | ? | |

=== Final ===
| Rank | Lane | Name | Nationality | Time | Notes |
|---|---|---|---|---|---|
| 1st place, gold medalist(s) | 2 | Manfred Germar | West Germany | 10.5 | |
| 2nd place, silver medalist(s) | 1 | Ira Murchison | United States | 10.6 | |
| 3rd place, bronze medalist(s) | 3 | Leonid Bartenyev | Soviet Union | 10.7 | |
| 4 | 6 | Sándor Jakabfy | Hungary | 10.8 | |
| 5 | 5 | Zdzisław Szczepański | Poland | 10.9 | |
| 6 | 4 | Joël Caprice | France | 10.9 | |
