= Athletics at the 1957 World University Games – Men's 200 metres =

The men's 200 metres event at the 1957 World University Games was held at the Stadium Charlety in Paris on 7 and 8 September 1957.

== Medalists ==
| Gold | Silver | Bronze |
|---|---|---|
| Manfred Germar; West Germany | Leonid Bartenyev; Soviet Union | Habib Thiam; France |

== Results ==
=== Heats ===
| Rank | Heat | Athlete | Nationality | Time | Notes |
|---|---|---|---|---|---|
| 1 | 1 | Manfred Germar | West Germany | 21.8 | Q |
| 2 | 1 | Habib Thiam | France | 21.9 | Q |
| 3 | 1 | Enrique Ichasmendi | Spain | 23.3 | Q |
| 4 | 1 | Vladimír Šimeček | Czechoslovakia | 23.4 | |
| 1 | 2 | Ira Murchison | United States | 22.1 | Q |
| 2 | 2 | Csaba Csutorás | Hungary | 22.1 | Q |
| 3 | 2 | Christian Larrieu | France | 22.2 | Q |
| 4 | 2 | Takayama | Japan | 22.8 | |
| 1 | 3 | Leonid Bartenyev | Soviet Union | 22.6 | Q |
| 2 | 3 | Fritz Helfrich | West Germany | 22.8 | Q |
| 3 | 3 | Takeo Tamura | Japan | 22.8 | Q |
| 4 | 3 | Ketmetto | Lebanon | 23.6 | |
| 1 | 4 | Sergio D'Asnasch | Italy | 22.3 | Q |
| 2 | 4 | Vladilyen Marin | Soviet Union | 22.6 | Q |
| 3 | 4 | Josef Trousil | Czechoslovakia | 22.7 | Q |
| 4 | 4 | Miyata | Japan | 23.3 | |
| 5 | 4 | Gerald Mason | Ireland | 23.7 | |
| 1 | 5 | Sándor Jakabfy | Hungary | 22.1 | Q |
| 2 | 5 | Lucio Sangermano | Italy | 22.3 | Q |
| 3 | 5 | Francis | Bermuda | 22.3 | Q |
| 4 | 5 | Nick Whitehead | Great Britain | 22.7 | |
| 5 | 5 | Bernard Chemorin | France | 23.0 | |
| 1 | 6 | Karl-Heinz Naujoks | West Germany | 22.3 | Q |
| 2 | 6 | Albert Plaskeyev | Soviet Union | 22.4 | Q |
| 3 | 6 | Klaus Gump | Austria | 22.6 | Q |
| 4 | 6 | Karl Heinz Kopitke | Brazil | 22.8 | |
| 5 | 6 | Janusz Bielski | Poland | 23.4 | |

=== Semifinals ===
| Rank | Heat | Athlete | Nationality | Time | Notes |
|---|---|---|---|---|---|
| 1 | 1 | Manfred Germar | West Germany | 21.5 | Q |
| 2 | 1 | Albert Plaskeyev | Soviet Union | 21.9 | Q |
| 3 | 1 | Csaba Csutorás | Hungary | 22.0 | |
| 4 | 1 | Sergio D'Asnasch | Italy | 22.2 | |
| 5 | 1 | Francis | Bermuda | 22.2 | |
| | 1 | Takeo Tamura | Japan | DNS | |
| 1 | 2 | Leonid Bartenyev | Soviet Union | 21.6 | Q |
| 2 | 2 | Ira Murchison | United States | 22.2 | Q |
| 3 | 2 | Christian Larrieu | France | 22.2 | |
| 4 | 2 | Fritz Helfrich | West Germany | 22.2 | |
| 5 | 2 | Enrique Ichasmendi | Spain | 23.1 | |
| | 2 | Lucio Sangermano | Italy | DNS | |
| 1 | 3 | Habib Thiam | France | 21.6 | Q |
| 2 | 3 | Sándor Jakabfy | Hungary | 22.2 | Q |
| 3 | 3 | Josef Trousil | Czechoslovakia | 22.3 | |
| 4 | 3 | Karl-Heinz Naujoks | West Germany | 22.3 | |
| 5 | 3 | Klaus Gump | Austria | 22.6 | |
| | 3 | Vladilyen Marin | Soviet Union | DNS | |

=== Final ===
| Rank | Lane | Name | Nationality | Time | Notes |
|---|---|---|---|---|---|
| 1st place, gold medalist(s) | 4 | Manfred Germar | West Germany | 21.3 | |
| 2nd place, silver medalist(s) | 5 | Leonid Bartenyev | Soviet Union | 21.7 | |
| 3rd place, bronze medalist(s) | 6 | Habib Thiam | France | 21.8 | |
| 4 | 3 | Albert Plaskeyev | Soviet Union | 21.9 | |
| 5 | 2 | Sándor Jakabfy | Hungary | 22.1 | |
| 6 | 1 | Ira Murchison | United States | 22.7 | |
