= Gert-Rudolf Flick =

German art historian and collector (born 1943)

- Born: 29 May 1943 (age 83); France
- Education: LMU Munich
- Occupation: Art historian
- Spouse: Corinne Müller-Vivil

Gert-Rudolf "Muck" Flick (born 29 May 1943) is a German art historian and collector, a member of the Flick family of industrialists whose wealth originated with Flick's grandfather, Friedrich Flick, who worked with the Nazis during the Second World War. He is the former publisher of Apollo magazine and is a visiting professor in the history of art at the University of Buckingham. He has written two well-received works on the history of art, Missing Masterpieces (2003) and Masters and Pupils (2008).

== Early life and family ==
Gert-Rudolf Flick was born on 29 May 1943 in France to Otto-Ernst Flick and his wife Barbara Raabe. His grandfather was Friedrich Flick, a German industrialist convicted after the Second World War of using slave labour in his factories.

He married and divorced first Princess Johanna von Sayn-Wittgenstein-Hohenstein. Secondly, he married and divorced Princess Donatella Missikoff of Ossetia with whom he had one son Sebastian (1989). Thirdly, he married Corinne Müller-Vivil, a confectionary heiress, with whom he has one daughter.

== Career ==
Flick has a PhD in law from LMU Munich. He joined the Flick firm in 1971 but with his younger siblings, Friedrich Christian Flick ("Mick") and Dagmar Flick, negotiated a sale of their interests in the firm that was realised in 1975 for a shared 405m marks and an additional negotiated payment of 225m marks later. Flick later made a significant gain on the sale of shares following a change in ownership of the Flick group.

In the 1990s, Flick was the publisher of Apollo magazine. He has written two major works on the history of art, a study of Missing Masterpieces (2003), and Masters and Pupils (2008) which postulated an apostolic succession of training in European art history. As of 2019, he is a visiting professor in the history of art at the University of Buckingham.

== University of Oxford ==
In 1992, Flick was appointed to the Court of Benefactors of the University of Oxford in recognition of donations he had made to the Europaeum project. A proposed Flick professorship in European thought at the university proved controversial due to concerns that its funding might be tainted by Flick's inheritance from his grandfather who had created his business empire partly during the Nazi period. In March 1996, Flick wrote to The Daily Telegraph to repudiate his grandfather's wartime activities. The funding of around £350,000 was withdrawn at Flick's request later that year.

== Park House ==
Flick was resident with his wife Corinne at Park House, Kensington, in central London which he is reported as having purchased in 1986. The house was home to his collection of early silver and Italian old master paintings and vedutà including a Canaletto scene of fireworks over Venice. In 2013 he won planning permission to expand the house by creating new rooms in the basement despite opposition from neighbours. The excavation was carried out, but the full plans were unrealised. The house was sold to the businessman Richard Caring for £40m in 2018.

== Selected publications ==
- View Paintings of a European Collector. Westerham Press, 1996.
- Missing Masterpieces: Lost Works of Art 1450-1900. British Art Journal in association with Merrell, London, 2003. ISBN 9781858941974
- Masters & Pupils: The Artistic Succession from Perugino to Manet, 1480-1880. Hogarth Arts, London, 2008. ISBN 9780955406324

== See also ==
- Flick family
