= Donatella Flick =

Italian philanthropist (born 1950

Donatella Missikoff Flick
- Princess of Ossetia
- Born: Rome, Italy
- Spouse: Gert Rudolph Flick (divorced)
- House: Missikoff
- Father: Prince George Missikoff of Ossetia
- Mother: Princess Valeria Missikoff of Ossetia
- Religion: Catholic
- Occupation: philanthropist

Donatella Flick (born Princess Donatella Missikoff of Ossetia, 1950) is an Italian philanthropist and the former wife of Gert Rudolph Flick of the wealthy German industrialist Flick family.

== Biography ==
Flick is the daughter of Prince George Missikoff of Ossetia and his Italian wife, Valeria. She is the sister of Prince Oleg Missikoff, a showjumping champion. She is a philosophy graduate from the University of Rome.

She married Gert Rudolph Flick, the grandson of the industrialist Friedrich Flick, from whom she separated in a controversial and widely publicized divorce case in 1997.

She is the godmother of Marie-Chantal, Crown Princess of Greece.

In 1990, she founded the Donatella Flick Conducting Competition to help young orchestral conductors to establish an international career. She is also known for her other philanthropic work, especially for her support of medical charities.

On 2 June 2006, she was appointed a Commander of the Order of Merit of the Italian Republic, and in 2007 was the recipient of a Montblanc de la Culture Arts Patronage Award, given to "outstanding art patrons whose personal commitment and achievements deserve wider recognition."
