= Sankt Augustin =

- Town
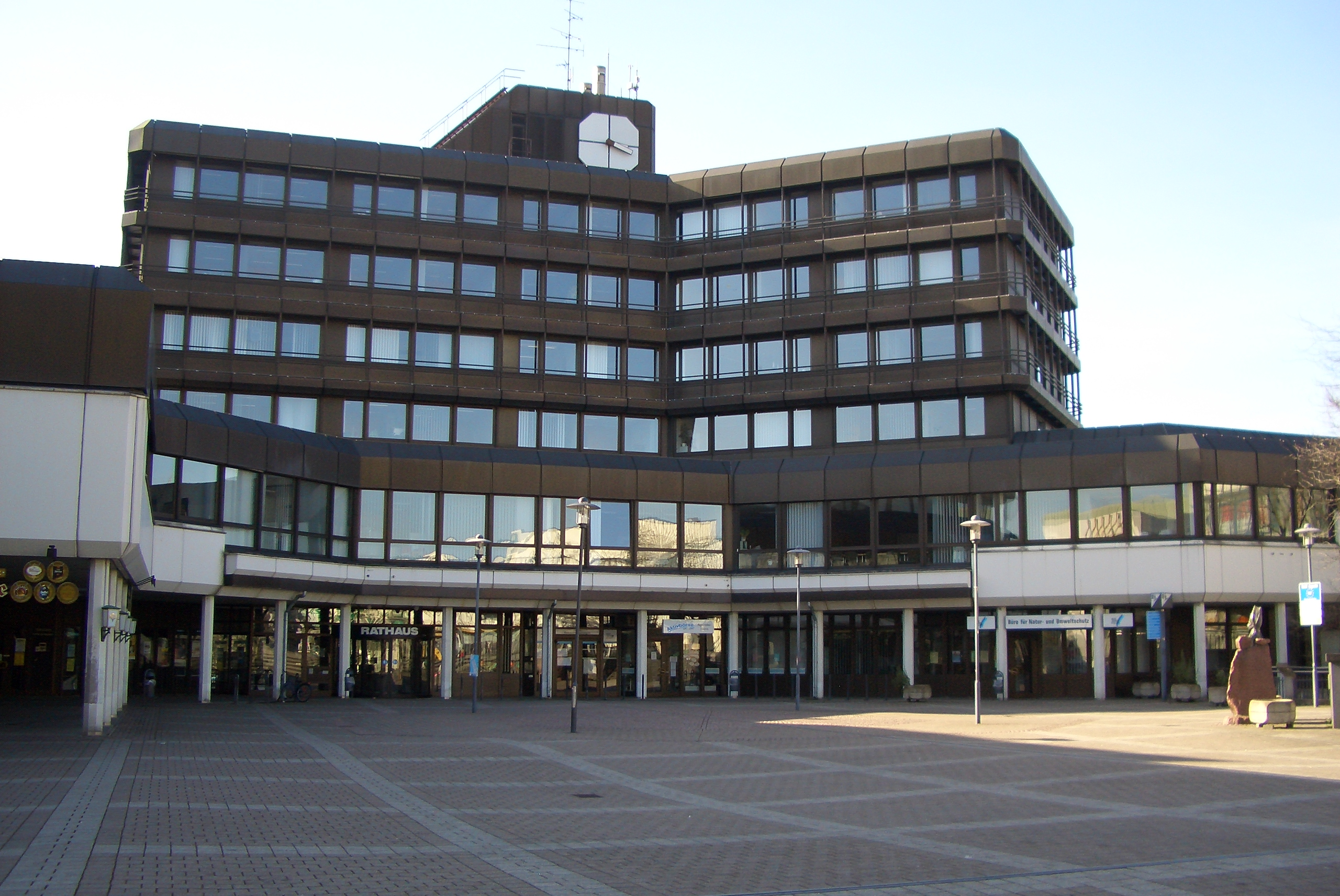
- Town hall

- Coat of arms

- Location of Sankt Augustin within Rhein-Sieg-Kreis district
- Interactive map of Sankt Augustin
- Location within Germany Location within North Rhine-Westphalia
- Coordinates: 50°46′12″N 7°11′12″E
- Country: Germany
- State: North Rhine-Westphalia
- Admin. region: Köln
- District: Rhein-Sieg-Kreis
- Subdivisions: 8

Government
  - Mayor (2020–25): Max Leitterstorf (CDU)

Area
  - Total: 34.22 km^{2} (13.21 sq mi)
- Elevation: 65 m (213 ft)

Population (2025-12-31)
  - Total: 56,033
  - Density: 1,637/km^{2} (4,241/sq mi)
- Time zone: UTC+01:00 (CET)
  - Summer (DST): UTC+02:00 (CEST)
- Postal codes: 53757
- Dialling codes: 02241
- Vehicle registration: SU
- Website: www.sankt-augustin.de

Sankt Augustin (German pronunciation: [zaŋkt ˈaʊɡʊstiːn]; Ripuarian: Sank Aujustin) is a town in the Rhein-Sieg district in North Rhine-Westphalia, Germany. It is named after the patron saint of the Steyler missionaries, Saint Augustine of Hippo (354-430). The missionaries established the "Saint Augustine Monastery" near the current town centre in 1913. The municipality of Sankt Augustin was established in 1969, and on September 6, 1977, Sankt Augustin acquired town privileges (German: Stadtrechte). Sankt Augustin is situated about 8 km northeast of Bonn and 8 km southwest of Siegburg. Sankt Augustin belongs to the economic region of Bonn/Rhein-Sieg as well as the scientific region of Bonn. With over 59,000 inhabitants, it is the second-largest town in the Rhein-Sieg district.

== Population ==
Historical population

Year	Pop.	±% p.a.
1965	25,288	—
1970	33,547	+5.82%
1975	43,000	+5.09%
1980	48,582	+2.47%
1985	50,621	+0.83%
1990	51,886	+0.49%
1995	55,065	+1.20%

Year	Pop.	±% p.a.
2000	55,248	+0.07%
2005	56,110	+0.31%
2010	55,442	−0.24%
2015	55,709	+0.10%
2020	55,590	−0.04%
2025	56,033	+0.16%

Source: Landesdatabank Nordrhein-Westfalen

== Visits ==
Margaret Thatcher visited on Wednesday 9 November 1983, with German Chancellor Helmut Kohl. A KGGS former schoolfriend had proposed visiting the German town to Mrs Thatcher. There was a six-monthly Anglo-German summit in Bonn, eleven miles away. Ivan Dawson attended, chairman of the Grantham twinning association.

== Mayors ==
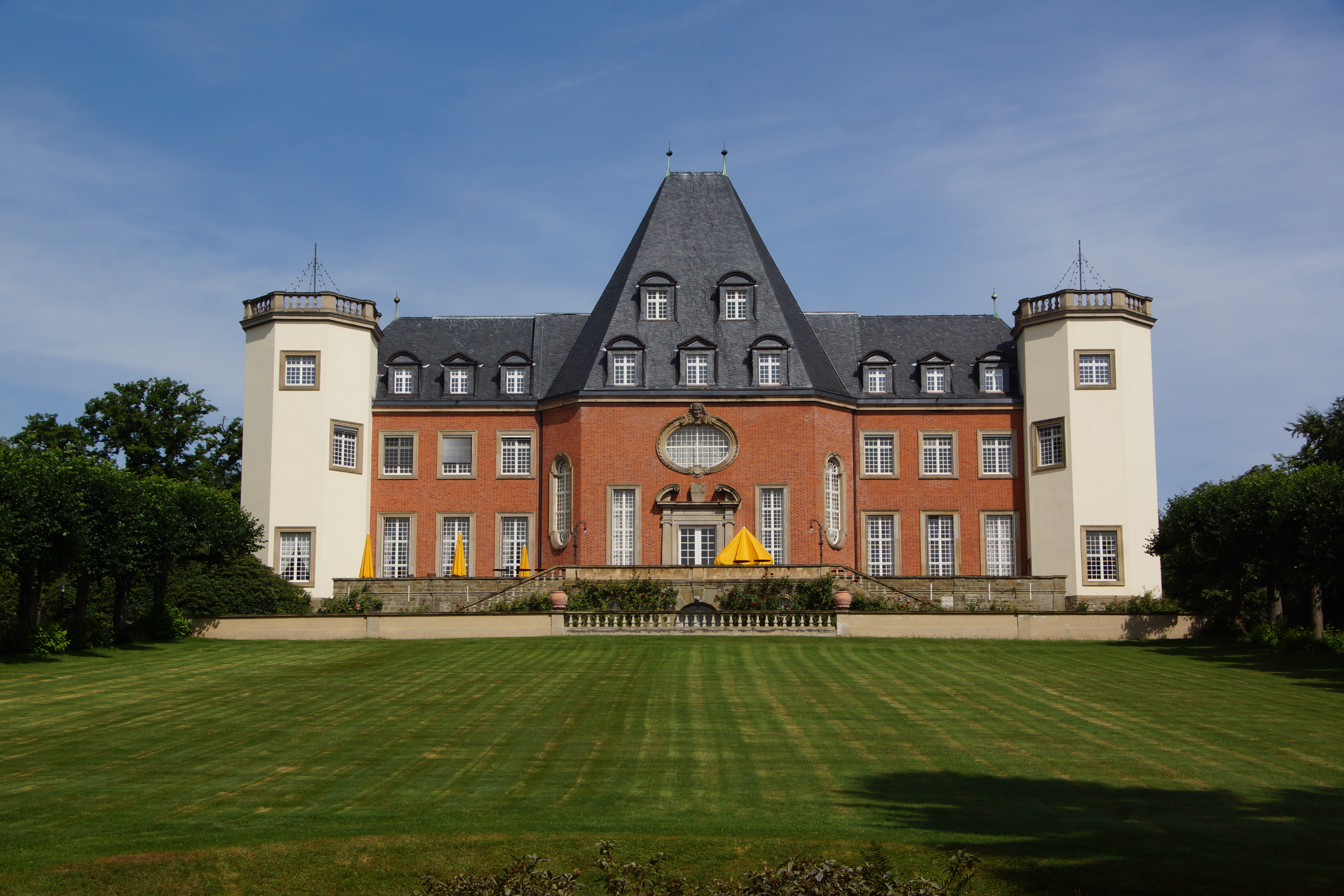
Birlinghoven Castle

- 1969–1984: Karl Gatzweiler (CDU)
- 1989–1994: Wilfried Wessel (CDU)
- 1994–1995: Anke Riefers (SPD)
- 1995: Hans Jaax (SPD) (temporary)
- 1995–1999: Anke Riefers (SPD)
- 1999–2020: Klaus Schumacher (CDU)
- Since 2020: Max Leitterstorf (CDU)

== Twin towns – sister cities ==
Sankt Augustin is twinned with:

- Grantham, England, United Kingdom
- Mevaseret Zion, Israel
- Szentes, Hungary

and has a Community Climate Partnership with:

- Jarabacoa, Dominican Republic (since 2022)

== Federal Government organizations ==
- Headquarters of the Federal Police Regional Directorate (Bundespolizeidirektion)
- Headquarters of the GSG 9 (Grenzschutzgruppe 9) since 1972; the counter-terrorism tactical unit of the Federal Police, formerly the Federal Border Guard (Bundesgrenzschutz)
- Federal Police Air Group (Bundespolizei-Fliegergruppe)
- Logistics Agency of the Federal Armed Forces (Bundeswehr) since 1957, relocated to Koblenz at the end of 2012
- Federal Agency for the Personnel Management of the Federal Armed Forces
- Information and Media Centre of the Federal Armed Forces (dissolved in 2014)
- Institute for Occupational Safety and Health of the German Social Accident Insurance
- Federal Archives (Bundesarchiv); one of the two "interim deposit" branches of the Bundesarchiv (the other located at Hoppegarten near Berlin), used for temporary storage of federal government documents

== Notable people ==
- Erich Hampe (1889–1978), army officer, died here
- Helmut Rohde (1925–2016), politician (SPD), died here
- Gábor Benedek (born 1927), Hungarian modern pentathlete, Olympic champion, lives here
- Klaus Förster (1933–2009), tax fraud investigator in Sankt Augustin
- Klaus Kinkel (1936–2019), lawyer and politician (FDP), died here
- Ute Kircheis-Wessel (born 1953), fencer, Olympic winner, works here
- Bettina Bähr-Losse (born 1967), politician (SPD) and former member of the Bundestag, works here
- Oliver Masucci (born 1968), actor, grew up in Mülldorf
- Luciana Diniz (born 1970), Brazilian horsewoman, lives here
