= Prapreče pri Trebnjem =

- Location in Slovenia
- Coordinates: 45°54′46″N 15°00′48″E
- Country: Slovenia
- Traditional region: Lower Carniola
- Statistical region: Southeast Slovenia
- Municipality: Trebnje
- Elevation: 280 m (920 ft)

Prapreče pri Trebnjem (pronounced [ˈpɾaːpɾɛtʃɛ pɾi ˈtɾeːbnjɛm], German: Prapretsche) is a former village in eastern Slovenia in the Municipality of Trebnje. It is now part of the town of Trebnje. It is part of the traditional region of Lower Carniola and is now included in the Southeast Slovenia Statistical Region.

== Geography ==
Prapreče pri Trebnjem stands northeast of the center of Trebnje on the terraces of a stream that disappears into the ground. To the south, the land drops to the Temenica Valley, and to the north it rises toward a low wooded hill that forms the watershed between the Temenica and Mirna rivers. Historically, it included the hamlet of Hrib, which is also now part of Trebnje. There are meadows at the bottom of the valley below the settlement, and tilled fields lie above them. Two springs, Studenec and Luža, lie below the houses in the settlement.

== Name ==
The name of the settlement was changed from Prapreče to Prapreče pri Trebnjem (literally, 'Prapreče near Trebnje') in 1953 in order to distinguish it from others with the same name. The name Prapreče is derived from the Slovene common noun praprot 'fern' and, like similar names (e.g., Praproče, Praprotno Brdo, Paprače = German: Farrendorf), it originally referred to the local vegetation.

== History ==
Iron ore was formerly mined in the vicinity and transported to the Auersperg iron foundry in Dvor. Prapreče pri Trebnjem was annexed by Trebnje in 1972, ending its existence as a separate settlement.
