= Willy Schmelcher =

German Nazi SS and police official (1894–1974)

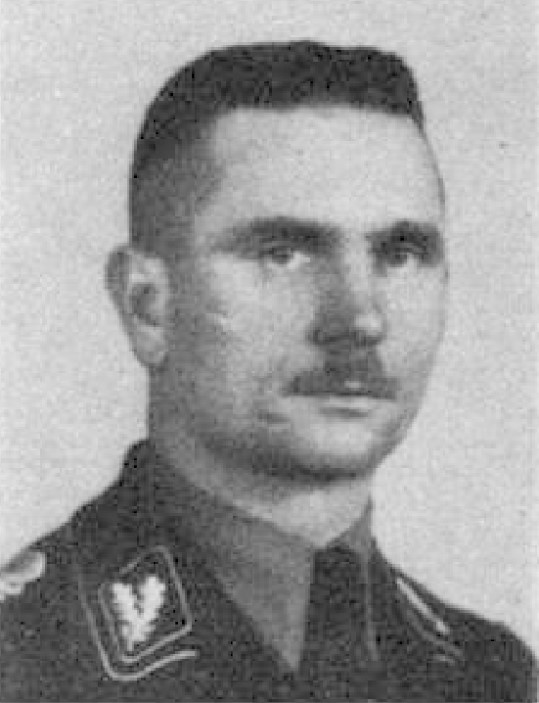
- Schmelcher, c. 1938

Chief, Technische Nothilfe
- In office October 1943 – 8 May 1945

Police President, Metz
- In office December 1942 – October 1943

Police President, Saarbrücken
- In office March 1935 – October 1942

Reichstag deputy
- In office 12 November 1933 – 8 May 1945

Personal details
- Born: 25 October 1894 Eppingen, Grand Duchy of Baden, German Empire
- Died: 15 February 1974 (aged 79) Saarbrücken, West Germany
- Party: Nazi Party
- Education: Technische Hochschule Stuttgart
- Profession: Civil engineer
- Civilian awards: Golden Party Badge

Military service
- Allegiance: German Empire; Nazi Germany
- Branch/service: Imperial German Army; Schutzstaffel; German Army
- Years of service: 1914–1919; 1930–1945
- Rank: Leutnant; SS-Gruppenführer; Hauptmann
- Commands: Higher SS and Police Leader, "Warthe"; SS and Police Leader, Shitomir; Tschernigow
- Battles/wars: World War I World War II
- Military awards: Clasp to the Iron Cross, 1st and 2nd class War Merit Cross, 1st and 2nd class with swords

Willy Schmelcher (25 October 1894 – 15 February 1974) was a Nazi Party politician and police official who rose to the rank of SS-Gruppenführer and was the chief of police in Saarbrücken and Metz. He was also a member of the Reichstag throughout most of Nazi Germany and served as an SS and Police Leader in the Reichskommissariat Ukraine and the Reichsgau Wartheland during the Second World War. After the war, he was interned, underwent denazification and secured a civil service position in the Saarland.

== Early life ==
Schmelcher, the son of a master glazier, completed Realschule in Eppingen in 1911. Until 1914, he studied at the building trade school in Stuttgart. On the outbreak of the First World War, he joined the Imperial German Army and served on the western front as a combat engineer. Commissioned a Leutnant in July 1917, he was captured by the British in September 1918, earning the Iron Cross, 1st and 2nd class. Released in January 1920, he studied civil engineering at the Technische Hochschule Stuttgart (today, the University of Stuttgart) and graduated with an engineering degree in 1925. He passed his state engineering examinations in 1927 and worked as a construction engineer.

== SS and Nazi Party career ==
Between 1923 and 1928, Schmelcher was active in the Viking League, a right-wing paramilitary unit dedicated to the overthrow of the Weimar Republic. After the dissolution of the League, he joined the Nazi Party (membership number 90,783) and the Sturmabteilung (SA), its paramilitary unit, in June 1928. As an early Party member, he later would be awarded the Golden Party Badge. He was the SA leader in Gau Baden from 1928 to August 1930. In June 1930, he became a member of the Schutzstaffel (SS member number 2,648). On 1 August, he left the SA with the rank of SA-Standartenführer. Schmelcher became the Führer of the 10th SS-Standarde in Neustadt in September 1932, remaining in that command until July 1935. He next held SS staff positions with Abschnitt (district) XXIX in Mannheim (July 1935 to April 1936) and with Oberabschnitte (main district) "Südwest" in Stuttgart (to January 1937) and "Rhein" in Wiesbaden (to December 1938), before being assigned to the Sicherheitsdienst (SD) Main Office, later a part of the Reich Security Main Office. From March 1935 to October 1942, he also was the Polizeipräsident (chief of police) in Saarbrücken.

Apart from his SS duties, Schmelzer also was involved in Nazi Party politics. In 1929, he was elected to the Neustadt city council, serving as the leader of the Nazi parliamentary group and becoming the council chairman. Following the Nazi seizure of power, he became chairman of the Nazi parliamentary group in the Rhenish Palatinate district assembly (Kreistag) in March 1933, and held this office until 1937. At the November 1933 parliamentary election, he was elected to the Reichstag from electoral constituency 27 (Palatinate) and retained that seat until the end of the Nazi regime.

== Second World War ==
In 1940, during the Second World War, Schmelcher performed military service with the 70th Infantry Regiment, being promoted to Hauptmann of reserves. After the fall of France, he was made Polizeipräsident of Metz in December 1940. Following the German attack on the Soviet Union, Schmelcher became the SS and Police Leader (SSPF) in Tschernigow (today, Chernihiv) from 19 November 1941 to 1 July 1943 and also in Shitomir (today, Zhytomyr) from 5 May to 25 September 1943. From 15 October 1943 to the end of the Nazi regime in May 1945, Schmelcher also served as head of the Technische Nothilfe, a civil defense organization in the main office of the Ordnungspolizei (order police). On 9 November 1943, he was promoted to SS-Gruppenführer und Generalleutnant der Polizei. In December 1944, he became the last Higher SS and Police Leader (HSSPF) "Warthe" with his headquarters in Posen (today, Poznań).

== Post-war life ==
After the end of the war, Schmelcher was interned by the Allies. In January 1949, he underwent denazification proceedings and was judged to be a "lesser offender". From 1954 to 1962, he worked in the civil defense department of the Saarland Interior Ministry. Schmelcher died in Saarbrücken in February 1974.

== SS and police ranks ==
SS and police ranks
| Date | Rank |
|---|---|
| 30 January 1931 | SS-Sturmführer |
| 9 September 1932 | SS-Sturmhauptführer |
| 10 September 1932 | SS-Sturmbannführer |
| 20 April 1933 | SS-Standartenführer |
| 15 September 1935 | SS-Oberführer |
| 16 September 1942 | SS-Brigadeführer und Generalmajor der Polizei |
| 9 November 1943 | SS-Gruppenführer und Generalleutnant der Polizei |

== Sources ==
- Information about Willy Schmelcher in the Reichstag database
- Klee, Ernst (2007). Das Personenlexikon zum Dritten Reich. Wer war was vor und nach 1945. Frankfurt-am-Main: Fischer-Taschenbuch-Verlag. p. 542. ISBN 978-3-596-16048-8.
- Schiffer Publishing Ltd., ed. (2000). SS Officers List: SS-Standartenführer to SS-Oberstgruppenführer (as of 30 January 1942). Schiffer Military History Publishing. ISBN 0-7643-1061-5.
- Stockhorst, Erich (1985). 5000 Köpfe: Wer War Was im 3. Reich. Arndt. p. 383, ISBN 978-3-887-41116-9.
- Yerger, Mark C. (1997). Allgemeine-SS: The Commands, Units and Leaders of the General SS. Schiffer Publishing Ltd. ISBN 0-7643-0145-4.
