= Hrib, Trebnje =

Hrib
- Location in Slovenia
- Coordinates: 45°54′53″N 15°01′00″E
- Country: Slovenia
- Traditional region: Lower Carniola
- Statistical region: Southeast Slovenia
- Municipality: Trebnje
- Elevation: 313 m (1,027 ft)

Hrib (pronounced [ˈxɾiːp]) is a former village in eastern Slovenia in the Municipality of Trebnje. It is now part of the town of Trebnje. It is part of the traditional region of Lower Carniola and is now included in the Southeast Slovenia Statistical Region.

== Geography ==
Hrib is a small clustered settlement northeast of the former village center of Prapreče pri Trebnjem. It stands on a hill about 30 meters (98 ft) higher in elevation than Prapreče pri Trebnjem.

== Name ==
The name of the village was sometimes written in hyphenated form together with Prapreče pri Trebnjem as Prapreče-Hrib. The name Hrib (from the common noun hrib 'hill') is common in Slovenia, referring to the local geography.

== History ==
Hrib was generally referred to as a hamlet of Prapreče pri Trebnjem rather than a separate settlement. Hrib was deemed annexed by Prapreče pri Trebnjem in 1952, ending any existence it had as a separate settlement. Prapreče pri Trebnjem was then annexed by Trebnje in 1972 together with Hrib.
