= Erich Hampe =

Head of the Nazi civil defence organisation

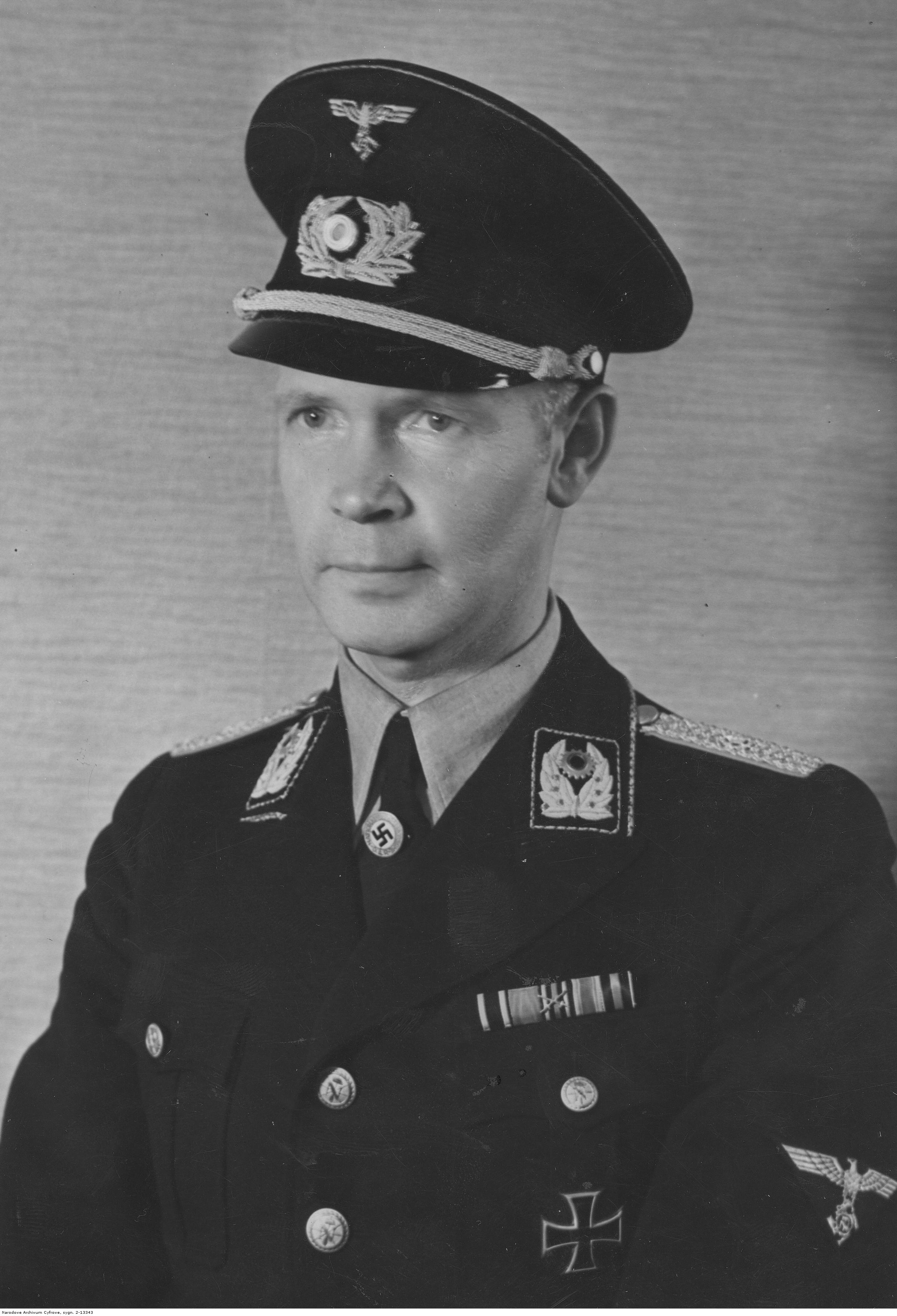
- Erich Hampe in the uniform of Technische Nothilfe
- Born: 17 December 1889; Gera, German Empire
- Died: 28 June 1978 (aged 88); Sankt Augustin near Bonn, West Germany
- Military career
- Allegiance: German Empire; Weimar Republic; Nazi Germany
- Branch: Technische Nothilfe; Army
- Service years: 1908–1919, 1941-1945
- Rank: Generalmajor
- Commands: Technical Troops
- Conflicts: World War I; First Battle of Ypres; First Battle of Champagne; Gorlice–Tarnów Offensive; Battle of Verdun; World War II
- Awards: German Cross in Silver; Iron Cross 1st Class; Bundesverdienstkreuz
- Other work: President of the Institute for Civilian Air Protection

Erich Hampe (17 December 1889 – 28 June 1978) was a German Army officer with the rank of Generalmajor, who served as Chief of the Department for Technical Troops in OKH during World War II. Previously he was Vice Chief of the Technische Nothilfe as well as an editor and the author of the official history of German civil defense during the Second World War. During the postwar years, he served as the first president of the Federal Agency for Civil Defense (Bundesanstalt für zivilen Luftschutz).

Born in 1889, Hampe entered army service within the German Army on in 1908 as an officer candidate. In 1912, when he was discharged to the Army Reserve. Hampe began subsequently work as Chief Editor of the "Die Post" newspaper, which closely cooperated with Free Conservative Party.

With the outbreak of the World War I, Hampe was called up in August 1914 and assigned to a machine gun-detachment; he was posted to the Guard Corps and ordered to the Western front. He participated in the First Battle of Ypres, the First Battle of Champagne, the Gorlice–Tarnów Offensive, and the Battle of Verdun. His military service ended on November 30, 1919, when he retired from the Army. During his service in the Army, Hampe was awarded with both classes of Iron Cross and Hesse Medal for Bravery.

In the beginning of 1920 in the Weimar Republic, he worked as Vice Chief of the Technische Nothilfe (TN). In 1941 he was transferred the Wehrmacht and served as inspector general of the Technical Troops (that originated in TN units transferred to the army). In the public service of West Germany in 1950, he started with the reconstruction of the Technisches Hilfswerk, continued as head of division in the German Federal Ministry of the Interior and finally as first President of the Federal Agency for Civil Defense (Bundesanstalt für zivilen Luftschutz). Hampe died in 1978 in Hangelar near Bonn.

== References and bibliography ==
- Bundesarchiv Koblenz Pers 101/60606-60608
- Gasschutz und Luftschutz. – Berlin : Ebeling. - 1 (1931) - 15 (1945)
- Die Räder : Zeitschrift der Technischen Nothilfe. - Berlin : Räder-Verl. - 1 (1920) - 26 (1945)
- [Autobiography] ... als alles in Scherben fiel : Erinnerungen des Generalmajors a.D., ehemaligen Generals der Technischen Truppen und Präsident der Bundesanstalt für zivilen Luftschutz / Erich Hampe. - Osnabrück : Biblio-Verl., 1979. - 185 S. - (Soldatenschicksale des 20. Jahrhunderts als Geschichtsquellen; 1)
- Der zivile Luftschutz im Zweiten Weltkrieg: Dokumentation und Erfahrungsberichte über Aufbau und Einsatz. Bernard und Graefe 1963. Download here (www.bbk.bund.de)
