= Flick affair =

1980s West German political scandal

The Flick affair was a West German political scandal of the early 1980s relating to donations by the Flick company, a major German conglomerate, to various political parties, according to Flick manager Eberhard von Brauchitsch, "for the cultivation of the political landscape". Otto Graf Lambsdorff, the federal minister for economic affairs, was forced to resign in 1984 after being accused of accepting bribes from CEO Friedrich Karl Flick.

The affair was made public by the news magazine Der Spiegel, which also gave the public access to documents and files that had been confiscated from the Flick company.

== Affair ==
The Flick affair began in 1975 with a share trade where the Flick company sold shares worth 1.9 Billion Deutsche Mark from Daimler AG to the Deutsche Bank. In January 1976, the Flick Company filed a tax exemption for this deal at the Federal Ministry for Economic Affairs, which was approved by Minister Hans Friderichs (FDP) and later also by his successor and party colleague Otto Graf Lambsdorff.

In 1981, tax fraud investigator Klaus Förster, after lengthy inquiries, found evidence that there had been money transfers from the Flick company to all parties that were represented in the German Bundestag parliament. A cash book kept by Flick company accountant Rudolph Diehl listed that next to other transfers, 250,000 Deutsche Mark were transferred to CSU chairman Franz Josef Strauss and 565,000 Deutsche Mark were transferred to CDU chairman Helmut Kohl, as well as payments to FDP and SPD politicians.

== Trial ==
Lambsdorff resigned from his office as a federal minister on 27 June 1984, after formal accusation was admitted at the Bonn regional court, and Friedrichs had to step down as the CEO of the Dresdner Bank. On the basis testimonies and documents, however, a quid pro quo was impossible to prove.

On 16 February 1987, Friderichs, Lambsdorff and von Brauchitsch were only found guilty of tax evasion and assistance to tax evasion respectively. Von Brauchitsch received a suspended sentence, and both politicians were sentenced to a monetary penalty.

The Kohl government tried to pass a bill in 1984 which implied that everyone who had improperly received tax deductions for donations to political parties would be given an amnesty.

== Committee of inquiry ==
In 1984 the Bundestag found a committee to investigate. Two years of proceedings clarified that between 1969 and 1989, politicians of all major parties (CDU, CSU, FDP, and SPD) had received money from the Flick company: a total of 25 million Deutsche Mark.

During the proceedings, the CDU politician Rainer Barzel resigned from his office as President of the Bundestag on 25 October 1984. He had been accused of being entangled in the Flick scandal; a charge rejected by both the inquiry committee and the prosecuting authorities two years later.

Green MP Otto Schily, member of the investigation committee, later filed a complaint against Chancellor Helmut Kohl for alleged false testimony.
