= Otto-Ernst Flick =

German businessman (1916–1974)

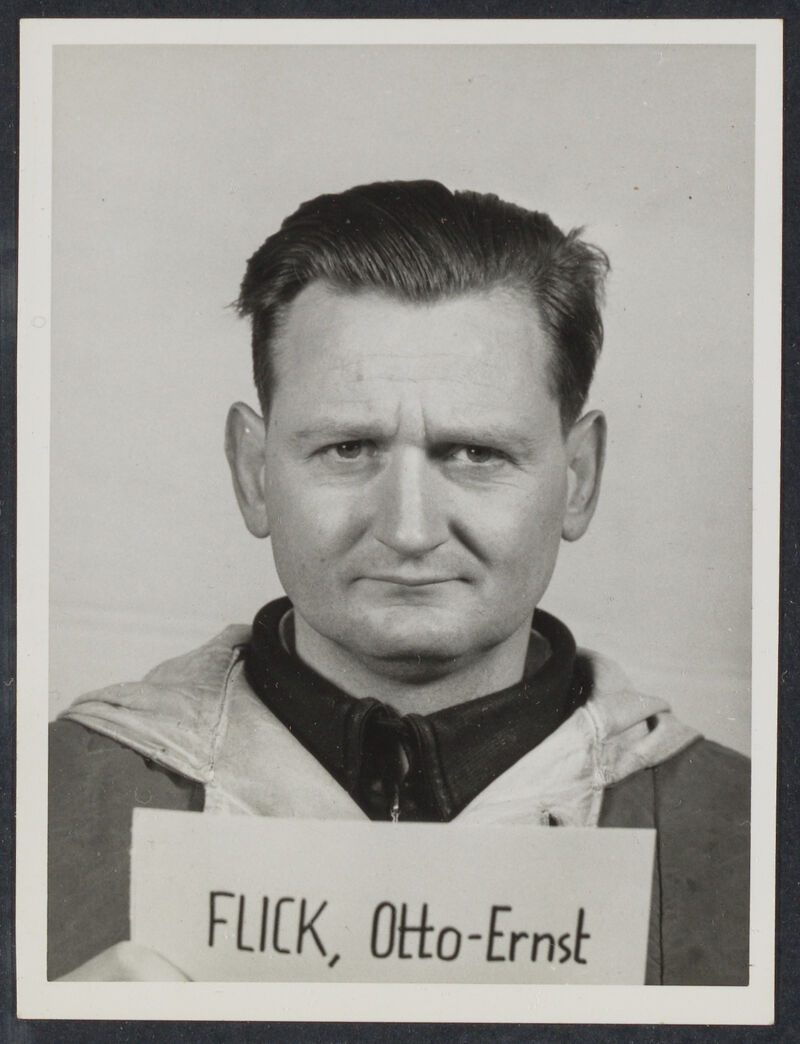
- Otto-Ernst Flick, during period of the Flick Trial, 19 April 1947–22 December 1947 (fifth of the Subsequent Nuremberg Trials) held at the Palace of Justice, Nuremberg
- Born: June 27, 1916
- Died: January 4, 1974 (aged 57); Meerbusch DE
- Children: 3, and 5 grandchildren
- Family: Flick family

Otto-Ernst Flick (27 June 1916 – 4 January 1974) was the oldest of three sons born to Friedrich Flick and wife Marie Schuss in 1916 in Germany.

== Biography ==
Otto-Ernst was born on June 27, 1916.

He entered the Friedrich Flick Industry Holding Company in 1953, but had a fall-out with his father in about 1960. Otto-Ernst took his father to court to secure his inheritance, and after a prolonged struggle, received a payment for settlement. He retired in Düsseldorf and died in 1974. His surviving brother, Friedrich Karl Flick gained full control of the business after he paid out the children of Otto-Ernst.

He died on January 4, 1974, at age 57 in Meerbusch DE.
