= Technische Nothilfe =

Nazi civil defence organization

Technical Emergency Corps
- Technische Nothilfe
- Standard of the TN during the Third Reich

Civil defence overview
- Formed: 30 September 1919
- Dissolved: May 1945
- Superseding Civil defence: Technisches Hilfswerk
- Jurisdiction: Weimar Republic (to 1933); Nazi Germany
- Civil defence executive: Chef der Technischen Nothilfe

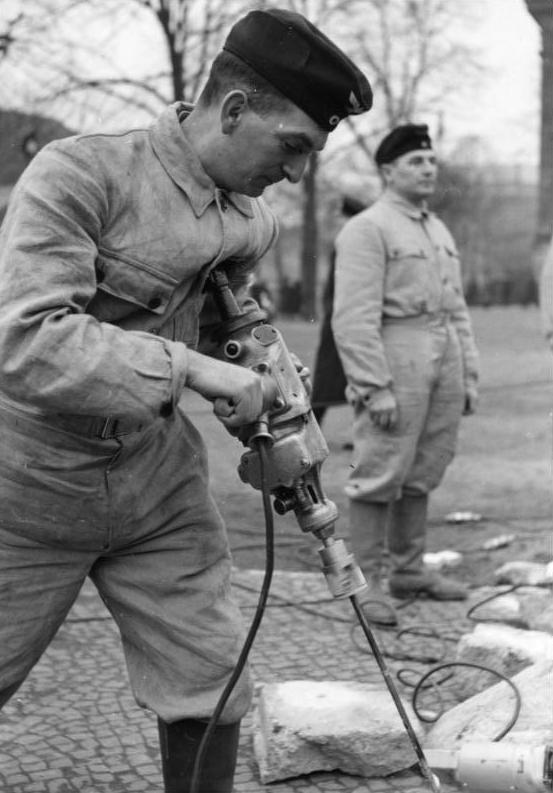
Members of TN demonstrate their skills for the general public in Berlin 1939.

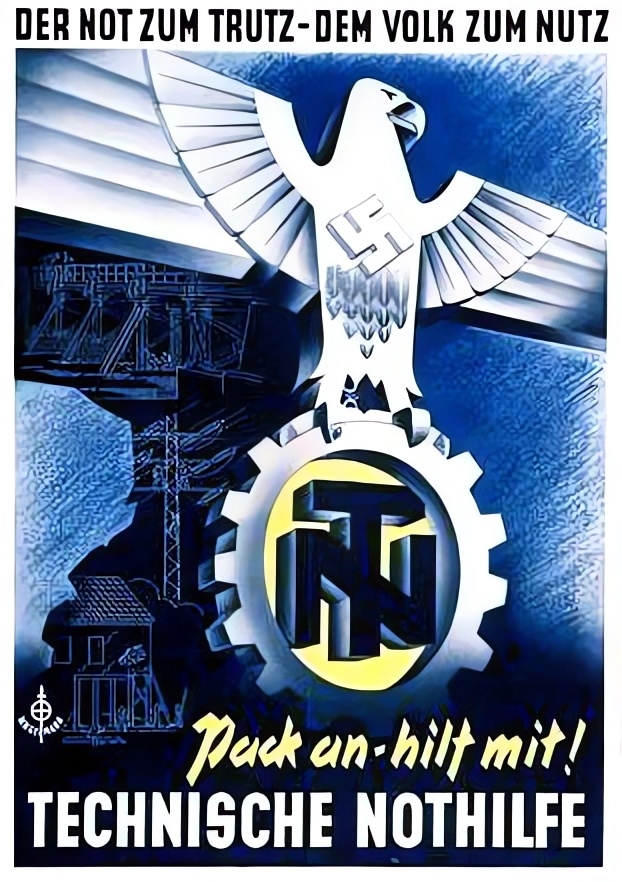
Poster for Technische Nothilfe

The Technische Nothilfe (abbreviated as TN, T.N, T.H, Tech Nh, TeNo, TENO; lit. 'Technical Emergency Corps') was a civil defence organisation in Germany from 1919 to 1945. It began as a strikebreaker organisation during the German Revolution, but developed into a volunteer civil defence and emergency response unit. The TN was responsible for technical civil defence during the Nazi Germany period.

== History ==
The Technische Nothilfe (TN) was founded on 30 September 1919 by Otto Lummitzsch, a civil engineer and former military officer, with the stated purpose of protecting and maintaining Weimar Germany's vital and strategic facilities, such as gas works, water works, power stations, railways, post offices, agriculture concerns and food production activities. At the time, Germany was in the midst of the German Revolution, with these vital infrastructure facilities under threat from sabotage and attack during a period when the country was bordering on civil war, caused by the collapse of German economy and political chaos following the end of World War I. This was exacerbated by a spate of politically motivated wildcat strikes, usually by rebellious left-wing elements hoping to exploit the situation. Membership of the TN was primarily drawn from army engineering and technical unit members of the Imperial German Army and Imperial German Navy, but it soon transitioned into a volunteer civilian organization registered by the Department of the Interior. The change was required by the demilitarisation requirements of the Treaty of Versailles, in order that it would not be classified as a military organization. Based on the nature of its operations, the background of its personnel was mainly conservative middle class, but included a large number of students, especially those in technical studies. One of the TN's main functions was strikebreaking, thus earning the animosity of trade unionists and the Social Democratic Party, and more particularly the Communist Party of Germany. It intervened as a volunteer aid organization when strikes could not be avoided, and when the public welfare was endangered in strikes of electricity, food service and railroad workers. The TN was seen as a threat by the working class, as it weakened the effectiveness of their strikes at a time of great economic distress.

By around 1925, as economic conditions in Germany had improved, strikes became less common and less aggressive. The TN's activities became less political, and was able to shift its activities into public welfare areas such as disaster relief (Katastrophendienst), with respect to floods, fires, industrial accidents, bridge and railway collapses; as well as responding to motor vehicle accidents in the countryside. A mobile Bereitschaftdienst (BD; literally ‘Call Service’) was set up, in order to be able to more readily respond. Clandestine air raid protection activities also began in the late 1920s and early 1930s as the Luftschutzdienst (LD; ‘Air Protection Service’). From 1931 to 1934, the TN also became involved in the Freiwilligen Arbeitsdienst (FAD; 'Volunteer Labour Service') and supervised training at over 12,000 locations. The FAD was later morphed into the Reichsarbeitsdienst (RAD). As the situation in Germany stabilised, membership of the TN declined from almost 500,000 in 1924 to 186,000 in 1930.

Following the founding of Nazi Germany in 1933, the TN focused on technical civil defence such as air raid rescue, general disaster response, and relief work. It became increasingly intertwined with the state, and therefore Nazism. In April 1934, Erich Hampe was appointed head of the TN when Lummitzsch was forced to resign because of his refusal to divorce his half-Jewish wife. From 1936, the TN was gradually absorbed into Ordnungspolizei as an auxiliary police organization and it came under the ultimate control of Heinrich Himmler, as the head of the police, and ultimately the SS. From June 1, 1943, the TN members, serving outside of the Reich, wore the green uniform of the Police and were referred to as the TN-Police. In addition to working within Germany, the TN was active in Nazi-occupied countries from September 1, 1939 as Einsatzgruppen, which followed the Wehrmacht and restored vital services and functions in Poland, France, Belgium, Netherlands, Luxembourg, and Norway. Local TN branch organisations were formed in some occupied countries, notably as the Technische Noodhulp in the Netherlands and as the Teknisk Nødhjelp in Norway.

The TN Einsatzgruppen participated in the occupation of the Saar, Austria, Sudetenland, Poland and then in the Western Campaigns of 1940. Their purpose was to secure vital industries, prevent or repair sabotage, rebuild the infrastructure (bridges, power plants, drinking water facilities, wastewater facilities, etc.) TN units were taken into Luftwaffe (air force) service early on and other TN units into Heer (land army) service in mid 1941. Those in Army were named the Technische Truppen, which was commanded by Erich Hampe, the long term Stellv. Chef der TN [#2 TN man from 1919 to 1940]. Also, some TN units served in the Kriegsmarine (Navy), although it is poorly documented. Other TN units, under the control of the TN Headquarters (Reichsamt Technische Nothilfe), remained in service until the end of World War II.

In 1945, the victorious Allies dissolved the TN. Its functions were assumed again in 1950 when Otto Lummitzsch was requested by the West German government to form the Technisches Hilfswerk (literally: 'Technical Relief') which exists to the present day with civil defence responsibilities and also participates in worldwide disaster relief responses.

== Leadership ==
=== Chief ===
Standard for the Chief

No.	Portrait	Chief of the TN	Took office	Left office	Time in office
1	Otto Lummitzsch [de]	Otto Lummitzsch (1886–1962)	January 1919	April 1934	15 years, 3 months
2	Hans Weinreich [de]	Hans Weinreich (1896–1963)	April 1934	September 1943	9 years, 5 months
3	Willy Schmelcher	Willy Schmelcher (1894–1974)	15 October 1943	May 1945	1 year, 6 months

=== Deputy Chief ===
Standard for the Deputy Chief

No.	Portrait	Deputy Chief of the TN	Took office	Left office	Time in office
1	Erich Hampe	Erich Hampe (1889–1978)	1920	1941	20–21 years

== Ranks ==
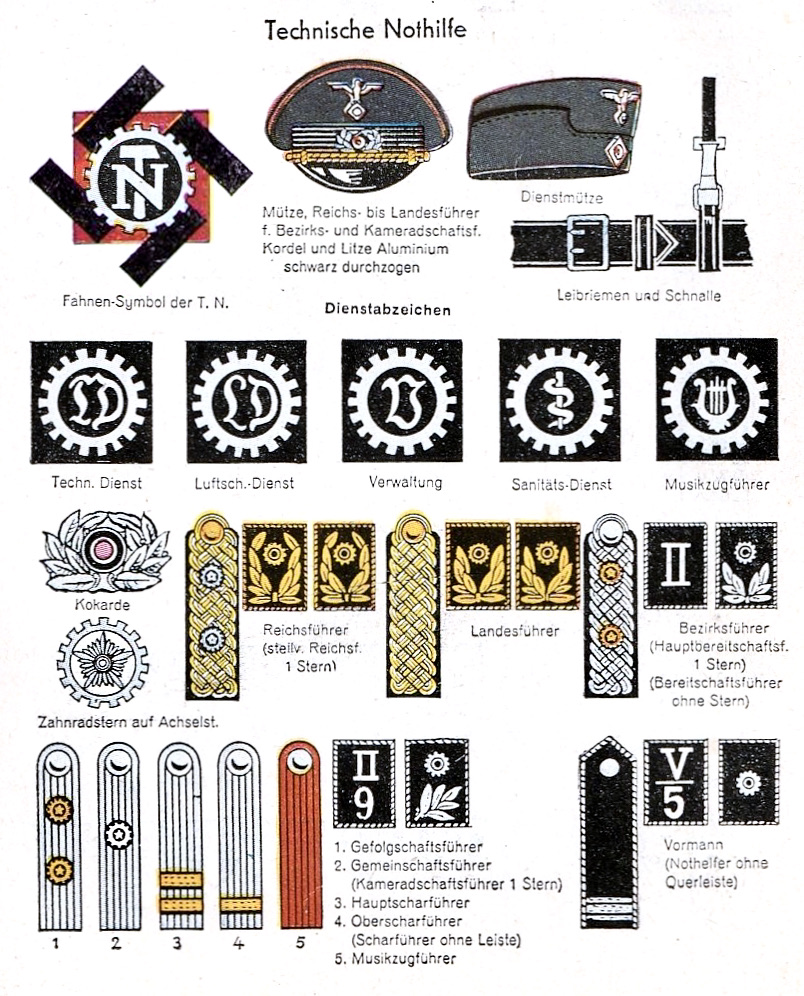
Flag symbol, uniform caps, and branch and rank insignia of the Technische Nothilfe. Chart from Der Soldatenfreund pocket calendar 1942.

Collar insignia	Shoulder insignia	Ranks		Equivalent rank in the Wehrmacht
1936–1943		1936–1943	1943–1945	Equivalent rank in the Wehrmacht
		TN-Anwärter	Anwärter der Technische Nothilfe	Soldat
		TN-Mann	—	Obersoldat
		TN-Vormann	Unterwachtmeister der Technische Nothilfe	Gefreiter
		TN-Obervormann	Rottwachtmeister der Technische Nothilfe	Obergefreiter
		TN-Scharführer	Wachtmeister der Technische Nothilfe	Unteroffizier
		—	Oberwachtmeister der Technische Nothilfe	Unterfeldwebel
		TN-Oberscharführer	Zugwachtmeister der Technische Nothilfe	Feldwebel
		TN-Hauptscharführer	Hauptwachtmeister der Technische Nothilfe	Oberfeldwebel
		TN-Stabsscharführer	Meister der Technische Nothilfe	Stabsfeldwebel
		TN-Kameradschaftsführer	Zugführer der Technische Nothilfe	Leutnant
		TN-Gemeinschaftsführer	Oberzugführer der Technische Nothilfe	Oberleutnant
		TN-Gefolgschaftsführer	Bereitschaftsführer der Technische Nothilfe	Hauptmann
		TN-Bereitschaftsführer	Abteilungsführer der Technische Nothilfe	Major
		TN-Hauptbereitschaftsführer	Oberabteilungsführer der Technische Nothilfe	Oberstleutnant
		TN-Bezirksführer	Landesführer der Technische Nothilfe	Oberst
		TN-Landesführer	Landesführer der Technische Nothilfe	Oberst
		Stellvertretender Chef der Technische Nothilfe	—	Generalmajor
		Chef der Technische Nothilfe	Chef der Technische Nothilfe	Generalleutnant
