= Park House, Kensington =

House in South Kensington, London, England

Coordinates: 51°29′36″N 0°10′20″W

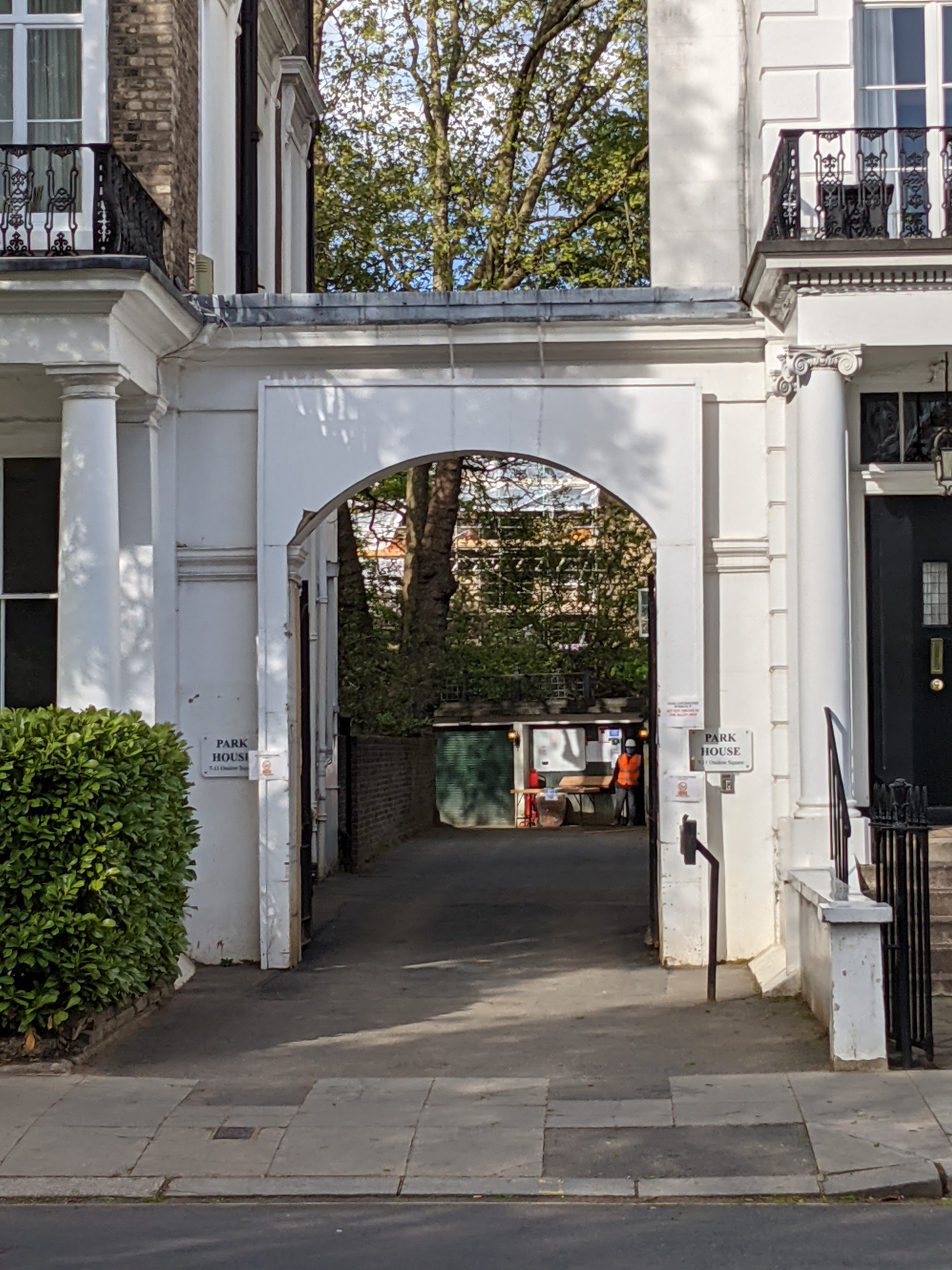
The entrance to Park House between 7 and 11 Onslow Square

Park House, at 7–11 Onslow Square, is a detached house in the South Kensington district of the Royal Borough of Kensington and Chelsea in London SW7. It is set in one acre (4,000 m^{2}) of land and is shielded by trees from public view.

Park House was created from a pair of lodges, Pelham Cottage and Park Cottage built in the 1840s that were merged into a single property in the 1980s.

The house was owned by Mark Birley who lived there with his wife Annabel Goldsmith. Goldsmith wrote a memoir, No Invitation Required: The Pelham Cottage Years about her time at the house. Goldsmith described her first visit to the house creating a "catch of pure excitement in my throat...I could not believe that such an oasis could exist only a few yards from South Kensington Tube station. In my daze of delight, I knew immediately that I had stumbled upon something magical".

The house was sold by the German art historian and industrial heir Gert-Rudolf Flick for £40 million to the businessman Richard Caring in 2017. Flick described Park House as "almost a country house in the middle of London". The house had been on sale for £105 million since September 2013.

Caring has submitted proposals to demolish the present house and replace it with an 18,000 sq ft (1,700 m^{2}) six-bedroomed two-storey house with a double-level basement. The new ground floor will have a dining room and a 48 ft (15 m) long drawing room in addition to a family room and a children's study. The planned basement will incorporate a cinema and a 50 ft (15 m) long swimming pool as well as a massage, steam and sauna rooms and a gym. Caring's proposal received 22 letters of objection from local residents. A £235,000 payment for local housing in the Royal Borough of Kensington and Chelsea formed part of the conditions for the council's approval of the plans.
