= Friedrich Karl Flick =

German businessperson (1927–2006)

- Born: 3 February 1927; Berlin, Germany
- Died: 5 October 2006 (aged 79); Auen on the Wörthersee, Carinthia, Austria
- Parent(s): Friedrich Flick; Marie Schuss

Friedrich Karl Flick (3 February 1927 – 5 October 2006) was a German-Austrian industrialist and billionaire.

== Early life ==
He was born in Berlin, the youngest son of Friedrich Flick, an industrialist and convicted Nazi war criminal, and Marie Schuss. After his studies, he worked in his father's company. In 1972, when his father died, he inherited the majority of the family business.

== Career ==
As the sole owner of the Friedrich Flick Industrial Holding (Industrieverwaltung), he had interests in major companies including Daimler-Benz, WR Grace, Gerling Insurance, Buderus, Dynamit Nobel, Feldmühle and others.

In 1975 he sold his part of Daimler-Benz to the Deutsche Bank for more than $1 billion. Major tax liabilities were avoided through "cultivation of the political landscape",—a process that turned into the Flick Affair in 1983 when it became apparent that about $25 million had been paid to German political parties in return for tax cuts and favorable rulings. Although Chancellor Helmut Kohl benefited from the dealings, he claimed he had "no recollections", while others resigned from their posts. In 1985 Flick sold off the remainder of his companies. When Deutsche Bank announced that it had bought his holdings for about $3 billion German marks, Flick retired in Austria, where he became a naturalised citizen.

In March 2006, his estimated net worth was $6.1 billion.

== Personal life ==
Flick married three times and had two children from his second and third marriages. At the time of his death, he was the wealthiest person living in Austria.

He died on 5 October 2006 at his villa in Auen on the Wörthersee, Austria.

In November 2008, it was reported that an oak coffin containing his remains was taken from his family's mausoleum at a cemetery at Velden am Wörther See, in what Austrian Federal Police believe may be an attempt to extort money from his widow. His widow Ingrid Flick, his third wife, inherited an estimated £4bn. She and his children are now under police guard. The body was returned in 2009.

== See also ==
- List of billionaires
- Flick family
