= Schiefling am Wörthersee =

- Municipality
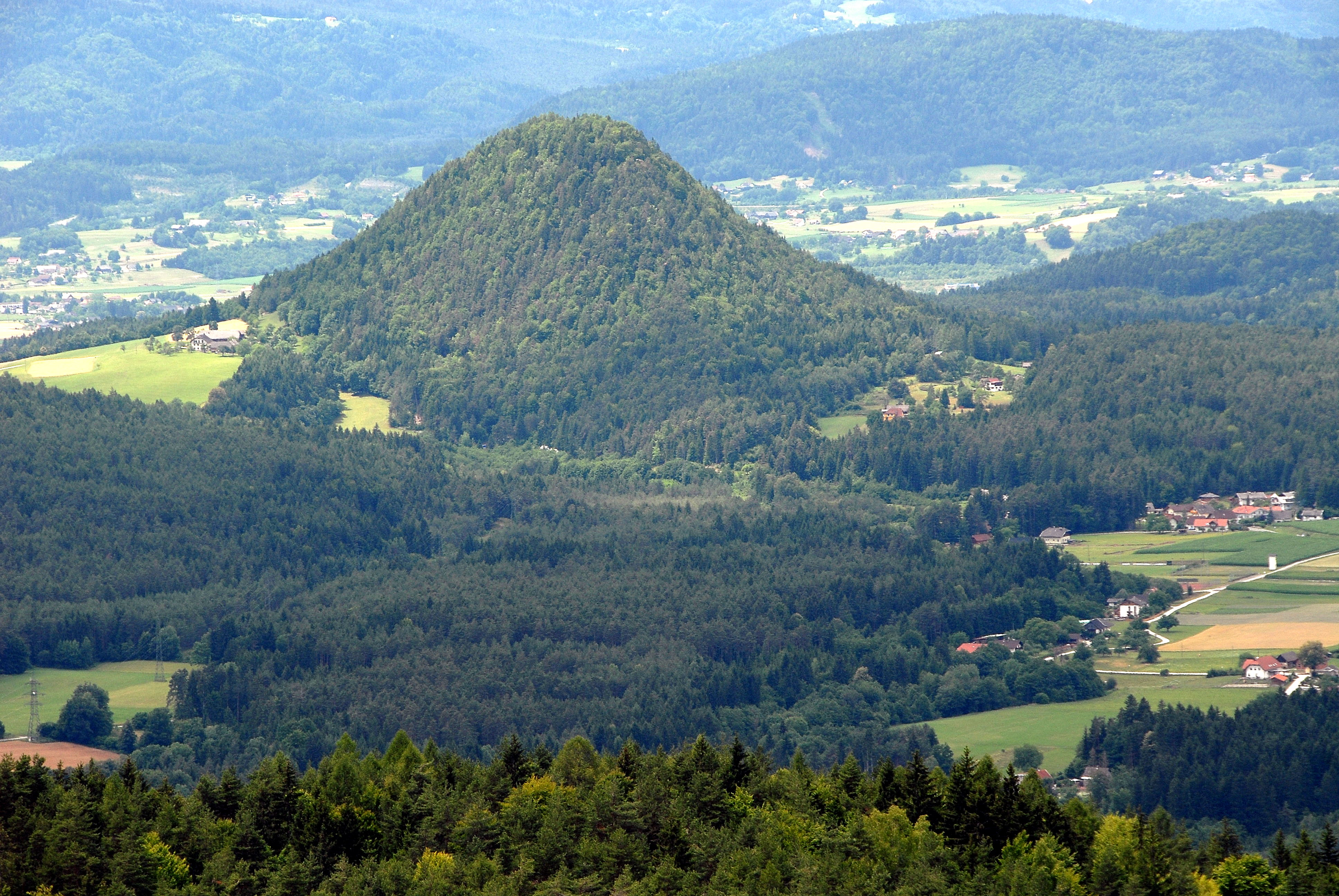

- Coat of arms

- Location of Schiefling am Wörthersee within Carinthia Location of Schiefling am Wörthersee within Austria
- Coordinates: 46°36′6″N 14°5′52″E
- Country: Austria
- State: Carinthia
- District: Klagenfurt-Land

Government
  - Mayor: Valentin Andreas Happe (ÖVP)

Area
  - Total: 28.64 km^{2} (11.06 sq mi)
- Elevation: 574 m (1,883 ft)

Population (2018-01-01)
  - Total: 2,651
  - Density: 92.56/km^{2} (239.7/sq mi)
- Time zone: UTC+1 (CET)
  - Summer (DST): UTC+2 (CEST)
- Postal code: 9535
- Area code: 04274
- Vehicle registration: KL
- Website: www.schiefling.at

Schiefling am Wörthersee (formerly Schiefling am See, Slovene: Škofiče) is a market town in the district of Klagenfurt-Land in the Austrian state of Carinthia.

== Geography ==
It is situated along the low Sattnitz mountain range between the Wörthersee in the north and the Drava Valley in the south. The municipality of Schiefling also includes the Katastralgemeinden St. Kathrein (Podjerberk) and Techelweg (Holbiče). According to a 2001 census, 5.8% of the population are Slovene-speaking.

== History ==
Schiefling was first mentioned as Schüfling in a 1256 deed by the Carinthian Duke Ulrich III of Spanheim. It is known for the Kathreinkogel mountain, a prehistoric settlement area since the Mesolithic and also the site of a Roman fort. During the Decline of the Roman Empire in the late 4th century the castle was turned into an Early Christian church, named after Saint Catherine of Alexandria. Her attribute, the breaking wheel is featured within Schiefling's coat of arms together with a crosier, as the Slovene name Škof means "bishop". The town was renamed to Schiefling am Wörthersee on 1 June 2010.

== Personalities ==
Within the village of Auen (Log) the area of Schiefling reaches out to the southern shore of the Wörthersee. From 1932 on the composer Alban Berg had a residence here (the Waldhaus), where he worked on his opera Lulu and his Violin Concerto. The industrialist Friedrich Karl Flick spent the years after his retirement in Auen.

== Population ==
Village (German)	Village (Slovenian)	Number of people 1991	Percent of Slovenes 1991	Percent of Slovenes 1951
Techelweg	Holbiče	97	37.%	51.8%
St.Kathrein	Podjerberk	95	16.8%	68.2%
Ottosch	Otož	18	33.3%	100%
Penken	Klopce	191	9.9%	81.8%
Farrendorf	Paprače	171	10.5%	55.1%
Goritschach	Goriče	67	1.5%	13.7%
Roda	Roda	46	2,2%	18.4%
Zauchen	Suha	101	1%	7.9%
Albersdorf	Pinja vas	139	2.9%	8.2%
Roach	Rove	150	7.3%	38.2%
Schiefling	Škofiče	590	6.8%	38%
Auen	Log	275	1.8%	57.1%

== Twin town ==
- Romans d'Isonzo, Italy since 2000
