= Ira Murchison =

American athletic competitor (1933–1994)

Personal information
- Full name: Ira James Murchison
- Nickname: Sputnik
- Born: February 6, 1933 Chicago, Illinois, U.S.
- Died: March 28, 1994 (aged 61) Harvey, Illinois, U.S.
- Height: 5 ft 5 in (165 cm)
- Weight: 143 lb (65 kg)
Medal record
Men's athletics
Representing the United States
Olympic Games
Gold medal – first place	1956 Melbourne	4 × 100 m relay
Pan American Games
Gold medal – first place	1963 São Paulo	4 × 100 m relay
Bronze medal – third place	1963 São Paulo	100 metres
World University Games
Silver medal – second place	1957 Paris	100 metres

Ira James Murchison (February 6, 1933 – March 28, 1994) was an American athlete, winner of the gold medal in 4 × 100 m relay at the 1956 Summer Olympics.

Born in Chicago, Illinois, he attended Phillips High School. Murchison was noted for his exceptional speed from the starting block, which earned him a nickname Human Sputnik.

Before the Melbourne Olympics, Murchison equalled twice the 100 m world record of 10.2 and ran in Berlin a new world record of 10.1, thus becoming one of the favourites to win the 100 m Olympic gold medal. But at Melbourne, Murchison managed to finish only in a disappointing fourth place. He also ran the leadoff leg of the 4 × 100 m relay team for the United States, and helped the American team to a gold medal in a world record time of 39.5.

He attended the University of Iowa, but later transferred to Western Michigan. In 1957, Murchison equalled the 100 yd (91 m) world record of 9.3 and, as a Western Michigan University student, won the 1958 NCAA championships in 100 yd (91 m). At the 1963 Pan American Games, Murchison finished third in the 100 m and helped the American 4 × 100 m relay team to win a gold medal.

During the 1970s, Murchison was the coach of a women's track team in Chicago. One of the women he coached was 1976 Olympic sprinter, Rosalyn Bryant.

Ira Murchison died of cancer in Harvey, Illinois, aged 61.
