= Friedrich Flick =

German businessman and war criminal (1883–1972)

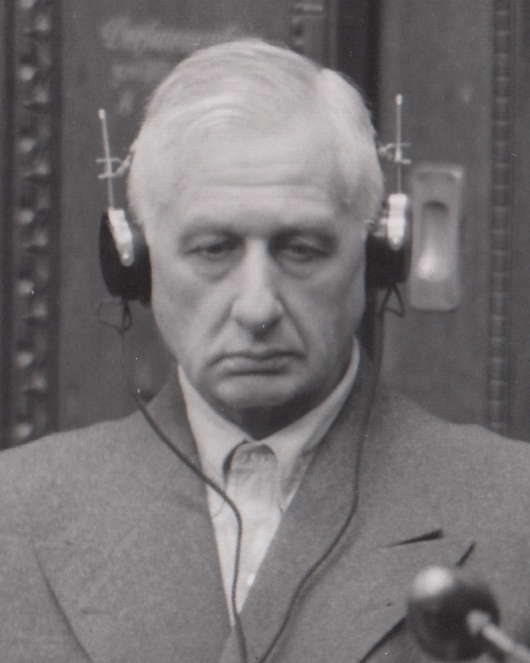
- Flick in 1947
- Born: Friedrich Flick; July 10, 1883; Ernsdorf, Kingdom of Prussia
- Died: July 20, 1972 (aged 89); Constance, Germany
- Education: University of Cologne
- Spouse: Marie Schuss (m. 1913; died 1966)
- Children: Otto-Ernst, Rudolf, and Friedrich Karl Flick

Friedrich Flick (10 July 1883 – 20 July 1972) was a German industrialist and convicted Nazi war criminal. After the Second World War, he reconstituted his businesses, becoming the richest person in West Germany, and one of the richest people in the world, at the time of his death in 1972.

Flick was the patriarch and founder of the Flick family.

== Early life and education ==
Flick was born 10 July 1883 in Ernsdorf (presently part of Kreuztal), Province of Westphalia, a son of Ernst Flick (1853–1915), a farmer and mining timber merchant, and Philippine Flick (née Winke; 1853–1912).

His father was relatively affluent and a minor participant in the Siegerland ore mines. After completing his high school education he entered a commercial apprenticeship at Bremerhütte. He then studied economics at the University of Cologne. In 1906, Flick graduated with the title of Diplom-Kaufmann (equivalent to Master of Business Administration).

== Professional career ==
Flick began his career as a clerk in the iron industry. A shrewd businessman, he was on the board of directors of an iron foundry by 1915 at age 32, becoming General Director four years later. He amassed a fortune during World War I and became extremely wealthy under the Weimar Republic, establishing major industrial concerns in the coal and steel industries.

He profited from speculation and stock deals. A conservative, he donated to many different mainstream political parties under the Weimar regime, and contributed greatly to the election campaign of conservative President Paul von Hindenburg. In 1932, he contributed 50,000 Reichsmarks (RM) to the up and coming Nazi Party.

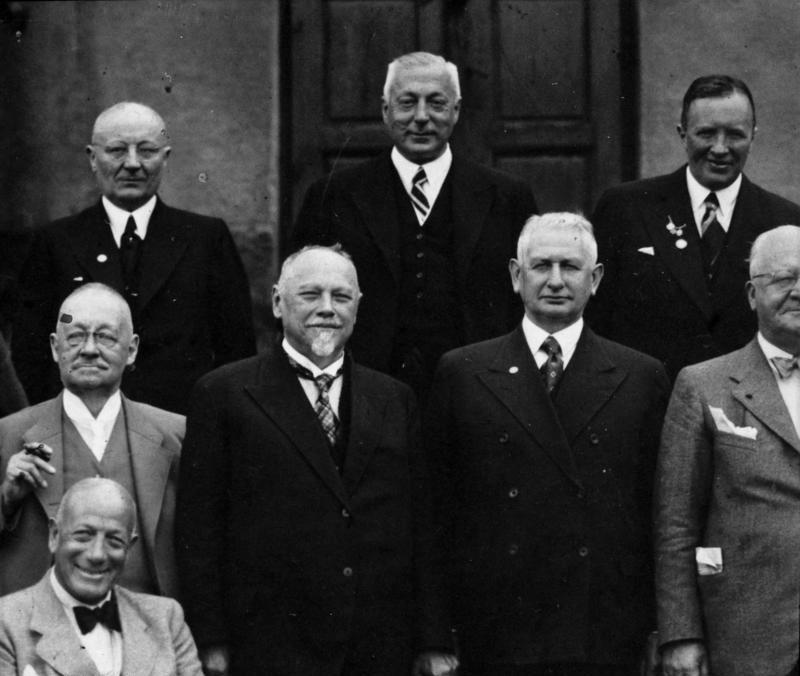
Friedrich Flick (3rd from left, front) with other industrialists, 1937.

== Nazi Party involvement ==
After the Nazi seizure of power in 1933, Flick increased his financial support to them, and it is estimated that he contributed over 7.65 million RM by the fall of the regime in 1945. He became a member of the Keppler Circle, later called the Circle of Friends of the Reichsführer-SS, a group of German industrialists whose aim was to strengthen the ties between the Nazi Party and business and industry. He was also made a member of the Academy for German Law, an organization financed by business contributions.

During the Nazi regime, Flick's businesses profited greatly from the process of Aryanization under which Jews were expropriated by being forced to sell their businesses, sometimes at a fraction of their market worth. Flick formally joined the Nazi Party on 1 May 1937, and in 1938 he was named a Military Economic Leader (Wehrwirtschaftsführer).

Flick's enterprises were instrumental in Nazi Germany's rearmament efforts. After the launching of the Second World War, Flick's companies employed an estimated 48,000 forced laborers in his coal mines, steel plants and munitions works. It is estimated that some 80 percent of these workers may have perished.

== War crimes trial ==
After the end of the war, Flick was arrested on 13 June 1945 and put on trial for war crimes on 19 April 1947. The Flick trial was one of the twelve Subsequent Nuremberg Trials of the military, political, and economic leadership of Nazi Germany, held after the Nuremberg trials (the "Trial of the Major War Criminals before the International Military Tribunal"), the most well-known trials which tried 22 of the most important captured Nazis. Like the other trials, the Flick trial took place at the Palace of Justice.

The defendants in this case were Friedrich Flick and five other high-ranking directors of Flick's group of companies, Flick Kommanditgesellschaft, or Flick KG. The charges centered on slave labor and plundering, but Flick and the most senior director, Otto Steinbrinck, were also charged for their membership in the above-noted "Circle of Friends of the Reichsführer-SS," founded in 1932 by Wilhelm Keppler and taken over by Heinrich Himmler in 1935. Its members donated annually about 1 million Reichsmarks to a "Special Account S" in favor of Himmler. Flick steadfastly refused to acknowledge any guilt whatsoever, stating: "nothing will convince us that we are war criminals." However, Flick was found guilty of war crimes and crimes against humanity, and on 22 December 1947 was sentenced to seven years imprisonment, with consideration for time served.

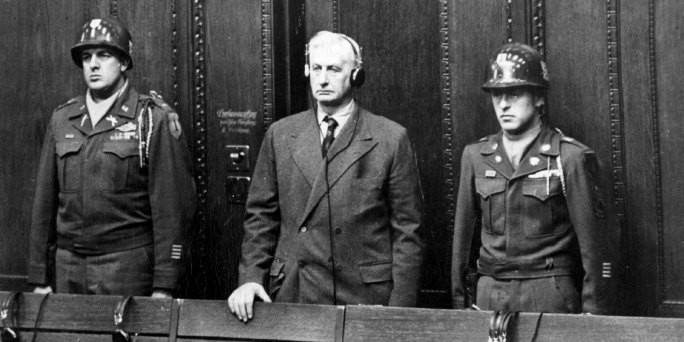
Flick at his sentencing, 22 December 1947.

== Later career ==
Flick was released early on 25 August 1950, due to the institution of good time credits. Despite his conviction, he quickly rebuilt his industrial empire and became one of West Germany's richest people by the 1950s. He also became the largest shareholder of Daimler-Benz and held large amounts of shares in Feldmühle, Dynamit Nobel, Buderus and Krauss-Maffei.

He was awarded numerous honours, including the Grand Cross with Star and Sash of the Order of Merit of the Federal Republic of Germany in 1963 and the Bavarian Order of Merit, and was an honorary senator of Technische Universität Berlin. At the time of his death, his industrial conglomerate encompassed 330 companies and around 300,000 employees.

== Personal life ==
In May of 1913, Flick married Marie Schuss (1890–1966), originally from Siegen, with whom he had three children;

- Otto-Ernst Flick (1916–1974), married Barbara Raabe, had three children including Friedrich Christian Flick, who established the modern art gallery Friedrich Christian Flick Collection
- Rudolf Flick (1919–1941)
- Friedrich Karl Flick (1927–2006)

Flick died in Constance, Germany on 20 July 1972 aged 89.

== See also ==
- Nuremberg trials
- Alfried Krupp
- IG Farben
- Slave labour
- War criminals

== Sources ==
- Wistrich, Robert (1982). Who's Who in Nazi Germany. Macmillan Publishing Co. ISBN 0-02-630600-X.
- Zentner, Christian; Bedürftig, Friedemann (1997) [1991]. The Encyclopedia of the Third Reich. New York: Da Capo Press. ISBN 978-0-306-80793-0.
