= Sándor Jakabfy =

Hungarian sprinter

Personal information
- Nationality: Hungarian
- Born: 1 May 1931
- Died: 2 April 2010 (aged 78)

Sport
- Sport: Sprinting
- Event: 200 metres

Sándor Jakabfy (1 May 1931 – 2 April 2010) was a Hungarian sprinter. He competed in the men's 200 metres at the 1956 Summer Olympics. Jakabfy won the gold medal in the 200 metres at the 1957 World Festival of Youth and Students. He was also the 1957 Hungarian Athletics Championships winner in the 100 metres.
