= Klaus Förster =

Klaus Forster (1933 in Schleswig – 26 January 2009 in Bonn) was a German tax fraud investigator who became known after he uncovered the Flick affair.

== Life ==
Förster was born into a family of lawyers. After studying law he became a civil servant at the North Rhine Westphalian financial administration.

A routine operation brought him on the trail of a party funding scandal that he stubbornly pursued and which became known as Flick Affair nationwide. The Fathers of the Mission House St. Augustin the Divine Word Missionaries had made, at the suggestion of Walter Löhr, a money laundering place.

High income people received donation receipts that they could submit as tax deductible. In a house search in the Divine Word Mission documents concerning the Flick Group fell in the hands of the investigators. The investigators concluded that the Flick group had used this institution as a place to launder money for more than a decade.
