= 1903 Consolidated Lake Superior riot =

Riot in Sault Ste. Marie, Ontario, Canada

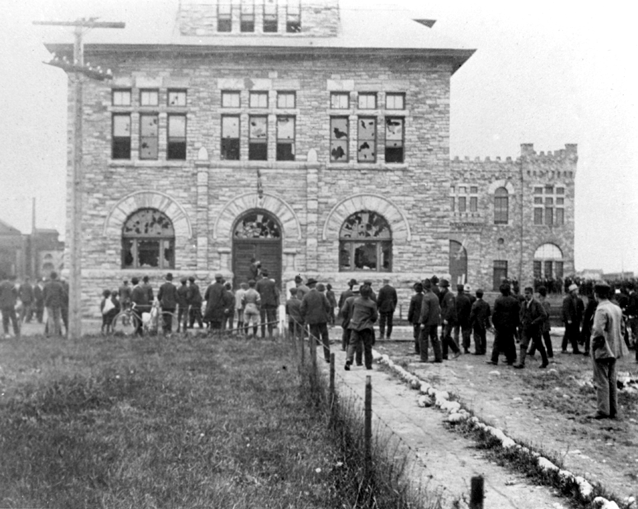
Clergue industries headquarters attacked by rioters, 28 September 1903

The 1903 Consolidated Lake Superior riot occurred on 28–30 September 1903 in Sault Ste. Marie, Ontario, Canada, as a result of layoffs and unpaid wages. Two police officers and four protesters were injured, company offices were looted, and elements of the Canadian army were called in to quell the unrest.

== Background ==
Industry in Sault Ste. Marie greatly expanded after the completion of a hydroelectric dam and the Sault Ste. Marie Canal on the St. Marys River, which allowed Francis Clergue to build an ever-expanding empire of inter-connected industries. This included four iron mines, five nickel mines, four town sites (Michipicoten, Helena, Wawa, and Searchmont), four hydroelectric dams, three sawmills, a veneer mill, a planing mill, three hotels, a pulp and paper mill, a sulphuric acid plant, a chemical laboratory and electrolytic works, a ferronickel plant and reduction works, a foundry and iron works, a steel plant with 10 related supplier plants, two power companies, two streetcar companies, two railways, a fleet of 11 Great Lakes ships, and numerous real estate holdings. These enterprises were all held under the umbrella holding company called Consolidated Lake Superior Company, which was the predecessor of many companies that continue to operate, including the Algoma Central Railway, Algoma Central Corporation, Algoma Steel, and the now-defunct St. Mary's Paper, among others.

== Financial Troubles ==
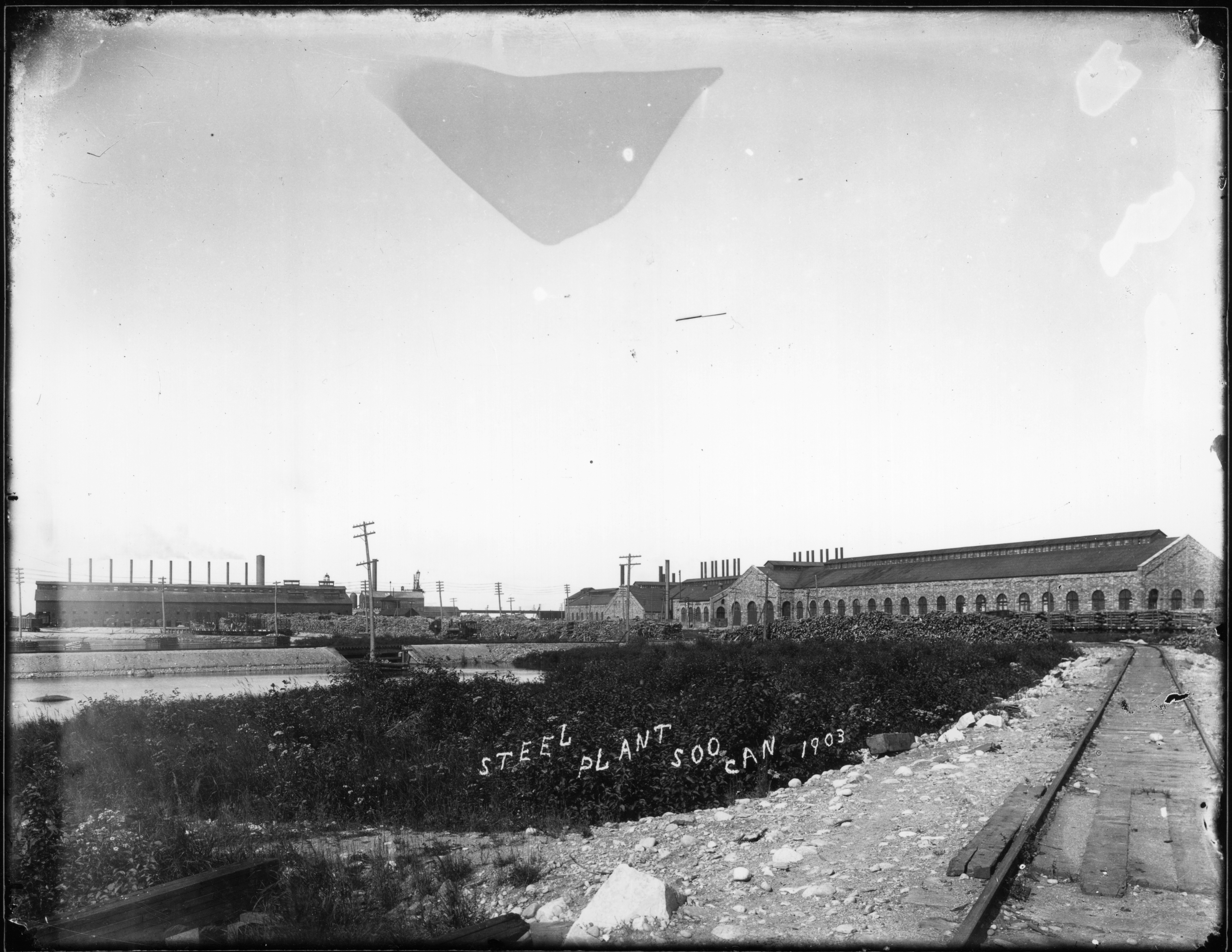
Steel plant, 1903

Due to the over-expansion of this industrial empire, the company's finances were strained. The inter-connectedness of the industries meant that these companies were largely selling to each other, with very little outside market for their goods. This was exacerbated by the diminished price of paper pulp and few orders for steel rails. In December 1902, 500 workers were laid off due to lack of orders. By September 1903, the company was no longer able to meet payroll or operating expenses, and the entire operation was closed, except the power plant and streetcars, laying off 3,500 workers. The company owed these workers over C$300,000 in back pay, most had not been paid in months. Many of these workers were woodsmen, who slowly made their way into town, walking miles along the now-suspended railroad. The company promised to pay workers their backpay by 28 September, but there was much distrust.

"The spirit of unrest among those about town who have been employees of the Allied companies is today more decided than it has been at any time since Saturday. With the assurance they would soon be paid the men are willing to look upon the bright side of things, but now [. . .] it is accepted as a fact that Monday next [28 September] will be no more of a pay day than any of the other days that have been set[.]"
— The Evening News, 24 September 1903

== Riot ==
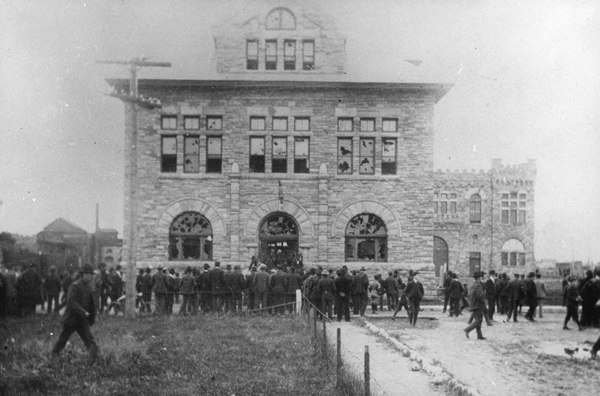
Rioters demanding pay, 28 September 1903

On Monday, 28 September 1903, the 3,500 unpaid employees converged at the company's headquarters, demanding their pay or "get satisfaction". Many were armed with revolvers and rifles, some were stolen from a general store the night before. They found the building locked, guarded by police, with a bulletin posted promising their pay within 30 days. The workers threw rocks, breaking many office windows, and threatened to burn down the company-owned hotels. Both sides fired shots, and two policemen were injured. The fire department used its fire hose to disperse the rioters. The workers later returned to the offices, gained entry and destroyed furniture and records. That night, a fight broke out in front of the fire hall, and two protesters were shot and had to be hospitalized.

The next day, the workers assembled again at the offices; two protesters were injured by gunshot. Many office employees were evacuated to a boat waiting in the Sault Ste. Marie Canal. Mayor W. H. Plummer read the Riot Act and called in the local militia. That evening, a special train arrived with 50 men from the Royal Canadian Regiment, including members of the Mounted Royal Dragoons with their horses.

The next morning, another train arrived from Toronto with 362 more militia from the Queen's Own Rifles and the 48th Highlanders. Ten protesters were arrested and charged.

== Aftermath ==
With the rioters quelled, Francis Clergue solicited the provincial government of George William Ross for assistance, arguing that his empire was "too big to fail". By 2 October, with a C$2-million loan guarantee from the province, as well as other bank loans, the angry workers were finally paid their long-overdue wages. On 13 October, the federal government passed a duty on imported steel, feeding a lifeline to the ailing company. The company was restructured, but most of the laid-off workers moved away seeking employment elsewhere. After being shuttered for almost a year, the company slowly resumed operations by August 1904. The City of Sault Ste. Marie was sent a bill of C$8,000 for the use of the militia.

== See also ==
- List of incidents of civil unrest in Canada
