= Ermatinger Clergue National Historic Site =

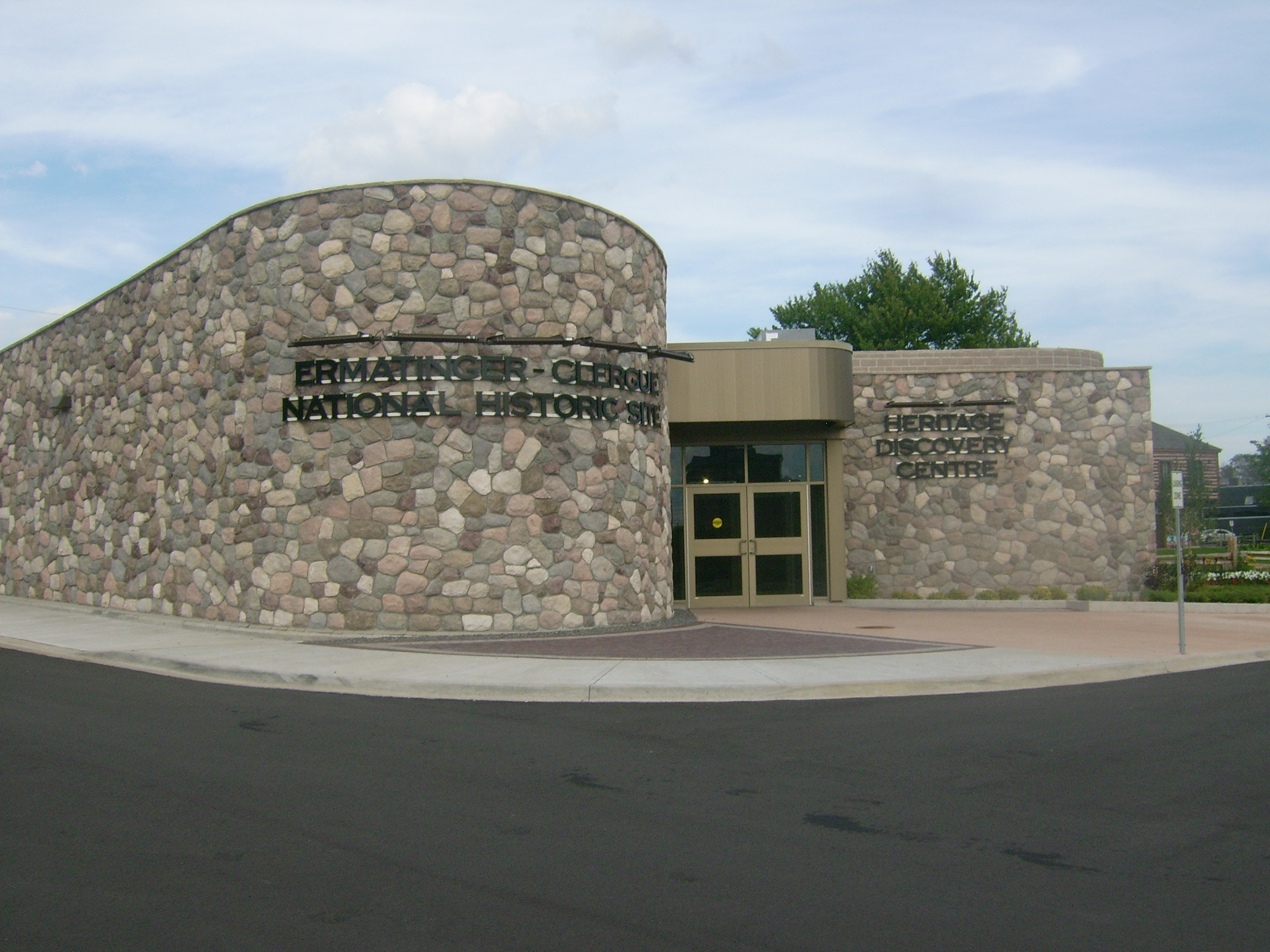
- Ermatinger-Clergue Heritage Discovery Centre
- Location: Sault Ste. Marie, Ontario, Canada
- Coordinates: 46°30′22″N 84°19′28″W
- Type: Museum
- Curator: Kathryn Fisher
- Website: www.ecnhs.com

The Ermatinger Clergue National Historic Site is a historic site and museum located in Sault Ste. Marie, Ontario, Canada.

== Site ==
There are three buildings on the site: the Ermatinger Old Stone House, the Clergue Blockhouse, and the Heritage Discovery Centre. The Ermatinger and Clergue houses are thought to be the oldest buildings northwest of Toronto. The Heritage Discovery Centre's construction was completed in 2014; this space was designed to provide additional interpretive and programming space for the historic site.

The site is managed by the city of Sault Ste. Marie, Ontario.

== Ermatinger Old Stone House ==
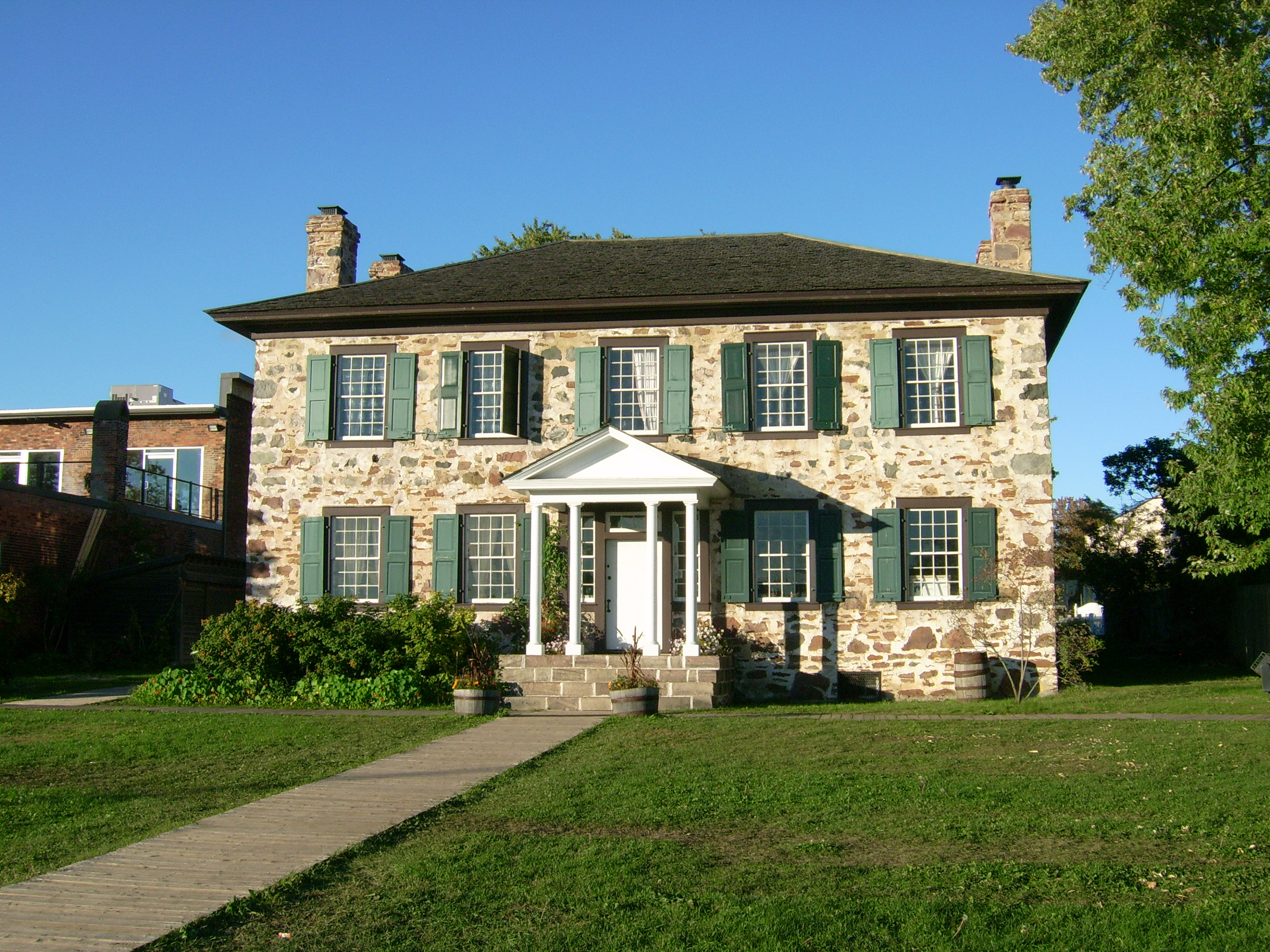
Ermatinger Old Stone House

The Ermatinger Old Stone House is the original building on the site, and was constructed between 1814 and 1823. It is considered one of the oldest surviving houses in Northern Ontario.

It was built by Charles Oakes Ermatinger, a former North West Company fur trader who lived in the home with his wife and children. He resided there until 1828, when he cut his ties in Sault Ste. Marie after the death of his brother Frederick William. It was designated as a national historic site in 1957.

The house is constructed from local stone and timber, and faces the St. Mary's River. It was considered big for its time, and was an imposing landmark when it was constructed. After the Ermatinger family left, the stone house was used by succeeding occupants as a mission, hotel, tavern, courthouse, post office, dance hall, tea room and apartment building. The house was bought by the City of Sault Ste. Marie in 1965 and was restored before opening to the public as a house museum.

In 1956 Sault Ste. Marie historian McNeice began researching the history of the Ermatinger Old Stone House and the Ermatinger family. Her work would ultimately result in the publication of a book titled, The Ermatinger Family of Sault Ste. Marie, which was published posthumously by McNeice's daughter.

== Clergue blockhouse ==
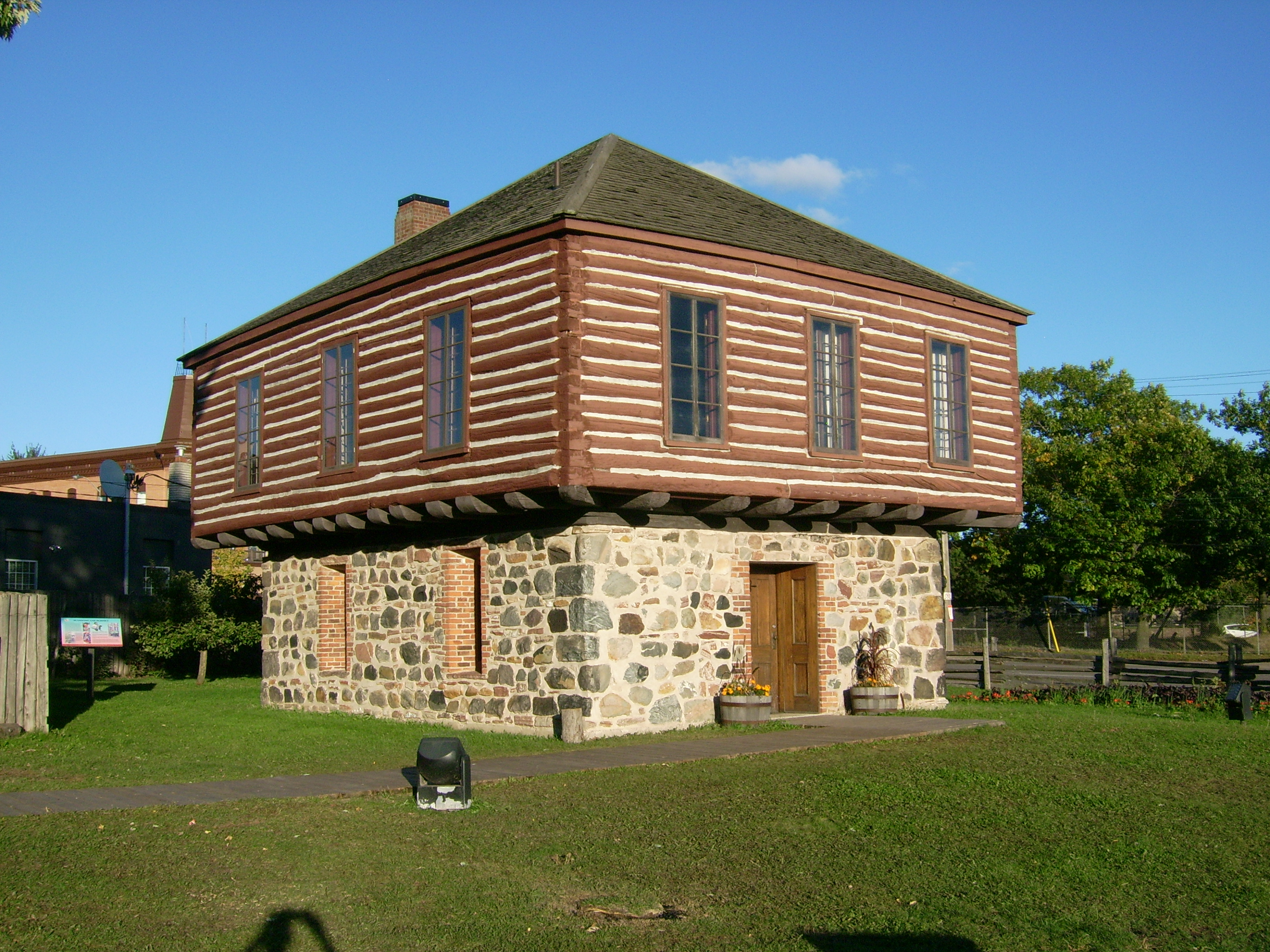
Clergue blockhouse

The Clergue blockhouse was originally a powder magazine at a North West Company trading post before the merger of the North West Company and the Hudson's Bay Company. When the last remaining factor at the post resigned in 1867, the site fell into disuse, until only the powder magazine's foundation building remained. American industrialist F.H. Clergue purchased the property and began the process of transforming it from powder magazine to living space. He lived in the blockhouse from 1894 to 1902.

In 1979 the blockhouse was designated as a local historical site by the City of Sault Ste. Marie, Ontario. In 1995 the St. Mary's Paper Mill was planning development that would jeopardize the location and structure of the blockhouse. The following year the City of Sault Ste. Marie purchased the building and relocated it from the St. Mary's Paper Mill to the Ermatinger Old Stone House site, forming a complex of historic buildings.
