= James Watson Curran =

Irish-Canadian newspaper publisher and editor

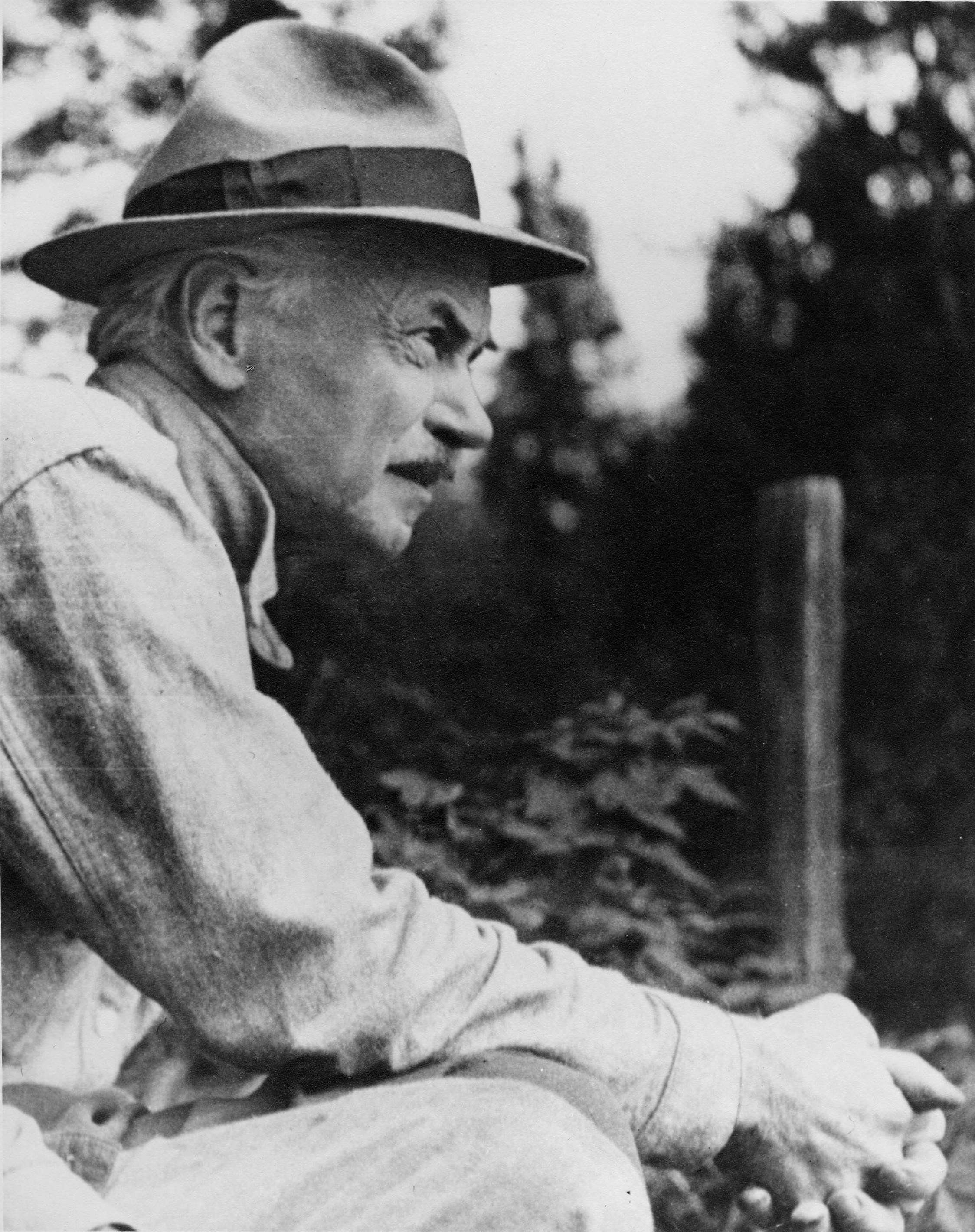
- Born: April 24, 1865; County Armagh
- Died: February 20, 1952 (aged 86); Sault Ste. Marie, Ontario
- Occupation: Journalist
- Spouses: Christine MacDonald King (m. 1897–1907); Edith Mary Pratt (m. 1909–1952)

James Watson Curran (April 24, 1865 – February 20, 1952) was a newspaper publisher and editor who settled in Sault Ste. Marie, Ontario after purchasing a local weekly newspaper in 1901. He went on to publicize and promote the city and the Algoma District. He played a leadership role in the formation of the Rotary Club of Sault Ste. Marie in 1918 and was actively involved in local history and tourism promotion.

== Early life ==
James Watson Curran emigrated to Canada from Ireland in 1873 at the age of eight. His father John Jones Curran was a miller operating a flax mill in Greggs Mill, Loughgall, County Armagh and later Crossgar, County Down before leaving for Canada in 1873.

The family traveled on the Sarmation. They settled in Toronto where they operated a millinery and dry goods store on Queen Street West between 1874 and 1875 before moving to Orillia.

John Jones worked for and later owned the Essex Centre Chronicle (1880–1884). He started the Orillia News-Letter in 1884, and also published the Canadian Workman (1879-1920).

== Journalism ==
=== Newspapers ===
- 1881–1884: Essex Chronicle
- 1884–1890: News-Letter, Orillia - News editor
- 1890–1897: Empire, Toronto - News reporter and later city editor
- 1897–1901: Montreal Herald - city editor
- 1901–1952: Sault Star - publisher and editor

Curran started on his father's newspaper in Orillia before moving to progressively responsible positions in newsrooms in Toronto and Montreal. Curran was News Editor of the Montreal Herald and was on his way west when he stepped off the Canadian Pacific train in Sault Ste. Marie in 1901, and stayed. He spent a week looking into the work of industrialist Francis Hector Clergue, and wrote 32 columns for the Montreal Herald.

He bought the weekly newspaper The Star from Moses McFadden. Together with his brother John Edward Gardiner Curran, Curran launched into his new newspaper business with enthusiasm and optimism.

The Brothers Curran beg to present their compliments and to say that from today they will be responsible for the issuance of the Sault Star . . . The aforementioned journalists ... believe Sault Ste, Marie offers an opportunity for an Interesting Paper. They can issue such a paper – at least they think they can and are willing to Take Chances.

The man who publishes a newspaper merely to accumulate money (or perchance to lose it) is a sordid varlet. Blessed is that man who has found his work. Doing the work we like is life's greatest pleasure, and may a man not be consecrated to running a newspaper as well as caring for souls?

Many of his children and grandchildren continued to publish the Sault Daily Star up until the sale of the newspaper to Southam Press in 1975.

=== Books ===
One of the benefits of owning your own press is that you can publish your own books. Curran published two books which were drawn from stories which appeared in the pages of the Sault Daily Star.

The first one was Here was Vinland (1939), drawn from 26 articles which appeared in the newspaper from August 1938 to February 1939. The stories sought to prove that Norsemen settled in the Great Lakes Region about 1,000 A.D. The stories chronicled discoveries of Norse relics, and the author opens with a plea for "open minds" and acknowledges the "Vinland debate" which is still ongoing. Some of the relics recorded by Curran remain in the collection of the Royal Ontario Museum, in Toronto. The controversy about the Beardmore relics remains current.

Later, in 1940, Curran published Wolves Don't Bite, a collection of stories about wolves. Some stories were drawn from outings of the Algoma Wolf Club. The book opens with a sketch of Old Sam Martin, which the caption "Any man who ssys he's been et by a wolf is a liar." Curran offered $100 to anyone who could prove he had been "et" by a wolf, a bet which was never paid.

== Sault Ste. Marie ==
=== Promotion ===
The wolf became the symbol of the Sault Daily Star, and is found in the masthead at the top of the first page. Curran wrote stories about wolves from about 1920 to 1940, many of which appear in his book Wolves Don't Bite, published by the Sault Star in 1940. The Sault and Algoma District became famous through Curran's offer to pay $100 if they could prove they had been the victim of a wolf attack. The money was never paid during Curran's lifetime, although there were many claims.

"This is to inform the public that the Sault Daily Star will pay $100 to the first person who can establish to the satisfaction of the editor that any timber or 'brush' wolf has attacked any person in Algoma."

Wolf week, which took place during the depression in 1932, was a six day jamboree organized by Curran, the Board of Trade, City Council, the Rotary and Kiwanis clubs and local businesses. Reports placed attendance between 10,000 and 30,000 and it was the most successful tourist attraction in the city's history. "Wolf Week, from July 25–30, 1932 gave the people of Algoma and 10,000 visitors form across North America a chance to forget the dismal economic situation and kick up their heels and howl," wrote Linda Richardson.

=== Rotary Club ===
Curran played a leadership role in the formation of the Rotary Club of Sault Ste. Marie in 1918, and served as its third President in 1922.

Community Night, which began in 1922, was an idea Curran proposed in an editorial, based on an "Old Home Week" event he had attended in his home town of Orillia. The event continues today as Rotaryfest, and remains a major fundraising event for Rotarians.

=== Local history ===
As one of his efforts to promote the Sault and celebrate local history, Curran, together with members of the Sault Ste. Marie Historical Society, organized The New Ontario Soldier's Reunion and Discovery Week held in August, 1923. Local industrialist Francis Hector Clergue was invited to return to the Sault to participate in a ceremony, laying a cornerstone at the cenotaph outside the Court House on Queen Street. The event commemorated Sault Ste. Marie's contribution to World War I by welcoming over 1,000 soldiers from the District of Algoma. The city's heritage was commemorated in the unveiling of two cairns, two war memorials and eleven plaques.

Part of the Discovery Week festivities, and later part of the Wolf Week program, was the staging of the play Hiawatha. Written by L.O. Armstrong, it was first performed in Desbarats for the entertainment of Longfellow's daughters in 1900.,

The "dignity of chieftainship in an Ojibway tribe" was given to Curran in 1923. His Indian name "Geeche-me-zhe-nah-we", means The Great Messenger.
