= Philip Dunne =

Philip Dunne or Dunn may refer to:

- Philip Dunne (Stalybridge and Hyde MP) (1904–1965), Unionist MP 1935–1937
- Philip Dunne (writer) (1908–1992), Hollywood screenwriter and director
- Philip Dunne (Ludlow MP) (born 1958), British Conservative Party politician, Member of Parliament from 2005 until 2024
- Philip Dunn (racewalker) (born 1971), American race walker
- Sir Philip Dunn, 2nd Baronet (1905–1976), of the Dunn baronets
