= James Hamet Dunn =

Canadian financier and industrialist

Sir James Hamet Dunn, 1st Baronet (29 October 1874 – 1 January 1956) was a Canadian financier and industrialist during the first half of the 20th century. He is recognized chiefly for his 1935 rescue and subsequent 20-year presidency and proprietorship of Algoma Steel.

== Early life ==
Dunn was born in the village of St. Peter's, now amalgamated into Bathurst, New Brunswick, Canada. His father owned a shipbuilding company whose fortunes had been all but wiped out by the sharp decline in the demand for wooden ships, and died when he fell into the harbour when James was an infant. His widowed mother, who was a particularly devout member of St. Luke's Presbyterian church, raised him on her meager earnings as a telegraph clerk. The bereft family also had help from the Fergusons, owners of a large farm, where his mother exchanged household duties for room and board. In his posthumous biography, boyhood and lifelong friend Max Aitken, 1st Baron Beaverbrook remarks on Dunn's exposure to the Shorter Catechism and the creed of John Knox through his mother's devotion. Specifically, Beaverbrook mentions the responses to Questions 74 and 75 (which explicitly command that wealth be acquired only by lawful means) as formative influences on the young Dunn.

From childhood, James Dunn was a voracious reader with an excellent memory. After completing his schooling, he left home to find employment and for a time he worked as a deckhand for an American shipping company on Lake Michigan. After this, he made his way to the east coast where he was employed by a manufacturing company in Lynn, Massachusetts. However, before long he returned home took a job as a clerk at the law firm of George Gilbert, where he worked alongside Richard Bedford Bennett, led him to the decision to apply to Dalhousie University Law School in Halifax, Nova Scotia. The small amount of money he had been able to save was not nearly enough to cover his education costs and Dunn worked at a variety of part-time jobs to pay his way through university, including a position in the university library. He graduated in 1898, then worked as a lawyer in Halifax before setting up a law practice in Edmonton, Alberta. Within a short time, Dunn was drawn to the booming economy of Montreal, Quebec where he landed a position with one of the city's prominent law firms.

== The stockbroker ==
James Dunn became involved in the legal aspects for underwriting activities for companies being listed on the Montreal Stock Exchange and in 1902 he established the J.H. Dunn & Co. stock brokerage company. With $20,000.00 borrowed from his father-in-law, he acquired a seat on the stock exchange. Canadian business at the time was still heavily dependent on investment money from the British financial markets and Dunn became an expert at raising foreign capital for the underwriting of securities as well as selecting the right places to invest. Articulate, outspoken, and with a personality that commanded respect, Dunn had already made contacts with a number of influential people, including a number of railroad executives, one of the most powerful group of entrepreneurs of the day.

As a stockbroker, Dunn's company put together a stock issue for William Van Horne, the former president of Canadian Pacific Railway. Van Horne had invested in the Cuba Railroad Company and wanted to raise capital for his "Havana Electric Company" venture. Already a friend of fellow New Brunswickers, Max Aitken (the future Lord Beaverbrook) and a lawyer named Richard Bennett, Dunn's brokerage work led to more business connections with some of the Canadian corporate elite, including George Alexander Drummond, Henry Pellatt and the up-and-coming Izaak Walton Killam. As well, he would become a friend and admirer of the successful American engineer-turned-entrepreneur, Frederick Stark Pearson.

However, the London financial markets were the centre of the economic universe and encouraged by Pearson, in 1905 James Dunn made the decision to take up residency in London. There he ran a new merchant bank in partnership with the Swiss investment dealer, C.L. Fischer, all the while working in conjunction with his Montreal brokerage.

At a time of rapid development in mechanized industry, as a result of large hydro-electric projects, shrewd investments, underwritings and stock promotions, James Dunn was soon a wealthy man. Dunn's brokerage house underwrote Pearson's ventures and sufficient capital was raised to allow Pearson to create a massive business empire that included the São Paulo Tramway, Light and Power Company in Brazil, the Mexico North Western Railway, the Mexican Tramway Company, and the Mexican Light and Power Company in Mexico, the Barcelona Traction, Light and Power Company and the British American Nickel Company (BANCo) in Canada.

All was not easy and as a director of the Sovereign Bank in Canada that fell victim to the stock market crash of 1907, he experienced severe financial difficulties. Added to this, mismanagement kept hidden by the officers running his Montreal brokerage house, one of whom committed suicide when his discrepancies were revealed, caused Dunn more financial grief. In 1913, his partner Fischer disappeared and went to ground leaving him with monstrous debts, as their firm was a partnership, not a limited liability vehicle, but he managed courageously and with help from his creditors to cover them all. Nine years later, Dunn forgave Fischer when the latter was "in virtual destitution", even to the point of giving him a job.

Because of a crucial need for nickel steel during the early years of First World War, the BANCo was expropriated by the British government and they delegated Dunn to reorganize it. In the process of that task, Dunn obtained the North American rights for the Hybinette process, which uses an electrolytic process to refine nickel. Dunn was instrumental in building the refinery at Deschenes, Quebec, across the river from Ottawa. BANCo had purchased the shares of the Dominion Nickel-Copper Company in 1913; its forerunner had been organized in 1907 by the Booth and O'Brien interests in the Sudbury Basin. It was they that projected the underground workings of the Murray Mine, but none of their projects reached completion until the advent of BANCo. In 1917 ground was broken in Copper Cliff for a BANCo smelter, and on 17 January 1920 the furnace turned out its first matte. BANCo was liquidated in July 1924 because of post-war competition from Inco and the Mond Nickel Company.

At the height of the Great War in 1915, his associate Pearson was killed when the Germans sank the RMS Lusitania. Despite these setbacks, he would quickly recoup and go on to become a multi-millionaire. It is reported that Dunn partnered with the Belgian financier Alfred Loewenstein in several business ventures, the duo emerging with more than £1,000,000 profit from their 1920s investment in British Celanese alone.

Dunn's close friendship with Max Aitken continued after the wealthy New Brunswicker also chose to live in England. Still very much in touch with his roots, after a 1911 fire destroyed the bells of Christ Church Cathedral in Fredericton, James Dunn donated the replacements for the original 1849 five-ton bells. The First World War provided him with a number of business opportunities and to the ability to serve Britain. For his World War I efforts, he was created a baronet in the 1921 New Year Honours. During his lifetime Dunn became a major industry leader rivaling even the Rothschilds as a central figure in British finance. Although he lived primarily in England during his stockbroking years and maintained a villa in France, Dunn frequently traveled to Canada to spend time at his fishing camp on the Nigadoo River not far from his birthplace.

== Algoma Steel ==
A number of Sir James Dunn's Canadian investments were in Northern Ontario mining ventures and he began a business relationship with Algoma Steel, a company in Sault Ste. Marie, Ontario. Founded by Francis Clergue, Algoma Steel had been taken over by Philadelphia, Pennsylvania investors after its 1903 bankruptcy. Overly dependent on the production of rail tracks, the steel company suffered through numerous problems and in 1908 Dunn had partnered with a British group of investors who included Robert Fleming to cooperate with an American consortium to form the Lake Superior Investment Co. to acquire Algoma Steel. Although Dunn's role at the time was important, he was still only a minority player and the American investors had control.

Algoma Steel went through years of ups and downs, marked by a lack of strong leadership, and in 1935 the company was again forced into receivership, and with it went the city: a plaintive cry for help from the mayor to Dunn details the ordeal. This time, at the age of 61, Dunn engineered a takeover so that he became the sole controlling shareholder thereby allowing him to take the tough but necessary reorganization measures to restore profitability to the steel maker. To accomplish this, he raised capital by negotiating bank loans, selling his beloved art collection and taking stock instead of income. As Algoma Steel's president and chairman of its board of directors, he successfully turned it into one of the largest steel mills of the day and for more than twenty years guided the fortunes of the company he would eventually make into one of the most profitable producers in Canada.

However, all was not sweetness and light for the first several years of his presidency: for example, in July 1937, the Bank of Montreal called in its loans—in a repetition of events that had destroyed Algoma under Clergue in 1907—but Morris W. Wilson of the Royal Bank stepped in to save the day. As Minister for Aircraft Production in wartime Britain, Beaverbrook would appoint Wilson in 1940 to manage his North American ministry.

Dunn's intestinal fortitude is responsible for his claim to at least two significant innovations in the industry. Hematite ore was the foundation of the steel industry in 1935, and it was indeed exploited by Algoma. Next to a hematite deposit owned by Algoma was a mountain more than 1,000 feet high but it contained a low-grade ore called siderite. The experts unanimously declared that Dunn, who wanted to exploit this mountain of siderite, was mad. Nowhere else in the world was an ore of this grade in commercial use. In the early months of 1939, a pilot process seemed to indicate success, but in order to be ascertained it would require full production. Dunn carried the investment through to the end and a positive result was his reward. The next innovation which Dunn developed into production at Algoma was then known as the "Sink-Float process". The need for innovation was due to the exhaustion of ore supplies at the Helen mine. The process, which had been established at Broken Hill Proprietary by Guillaume Daniel Delprat at the turn of the century because of a similar exhaustion, had been tried once or twice in the US but on ore quite different from that at the Victoria. No Canadian mines had developed this technique; no large-scale equipment was available for experimentation and so the pilot plant would be uncertain and expensive. The gamble was a success, and Dunn pioneered again. The Victoria mine was able for a time from 1945 to supplant the Helen mine, while the latter changed from an open-pit to, in 1949, an underground operation.

During the Second World War, the company benefited from the huge demand for steel by the military; however, financial calls from his associates, who needed or wanted to liquidate positions as a result of the French collapse, bedeviled Dunn, who retained in the end his Algoma shares and nothing else. Even then, he mortgaged them to his stockbroker friends. The benefit from a subsidized price for sinter, granted at the corporate nadir of 1935 by the provincial government of Mitchell Hepburn, was cancelled in 1942 by the Conant government. At times Dunn's relationship with the federal government minister in charge of the war effort, C. D. Howe was difficult; Beaverbrook relates a story in which he had to calm Winston Churchill because Howe or Mackenzie King, in the dark days of October 1940, had shredded Dunn's reputation. Howe threatened Dunn on 26 October 1940 with effective expropriation under the War Measures Act and the National Resources Mobilization Act: the government might obtain control of "trading, exportation, importation, production and manufacture" works, and require him "to place [himself], [his] services and [his] property at the disposal of His Majesty in right of Canada, as may be deemed necessary or expedient for securing the public safety, the defence of Canada, the maintenance of public order, or the efficient prosecution of the war, or for maintaining supplies or services essential to the life of the community." A letter to Churchill from Beaverbrook, who at the time was in the former's Ministry, was enough to secure the person and property of Dunn, but his health suffered ill effects, as presently will be related. The week after Dunn had a major surgery, Howe struck again. This time, Howe telephoned on 12 April 1943 to Wilson at the Royal Bank: if Howe's steel experts (likely the same experts Dunn had wrongfooted in the siderite development) were right, either Dunn must stand down from his Chairmanship of Algoma, or he would be forced to expropriate. Many precedents had accumulated over three years, both in the UK and Canada. But Wilson and his Royal Bank stood firm and refused to countenance this extreme. Wilson instead asked for disclosure of the government file, and Howe's bluff was shot. By August 1943, a vice-president at Algoma was removed and the way forward was clear.

Dunn and Howe later became friends, and Howe even acquired a summer manor next door to the Dunn estate, Dayspring, at the seaside resort of St. Andrews in New Brunswick. Howe even served as an Executor of Dunn's estate.

It was during the war that Dunn had two major health crises brought on by old age. These required hospital stays of 17 days and five weeks respectively. He and Christoforides, who throughout was by his side day and night, succeeded by artful means in keeping both stays from the press. Shortly after the end of the first bout with adversity, he married her.

== Canada Steamship Lines ==
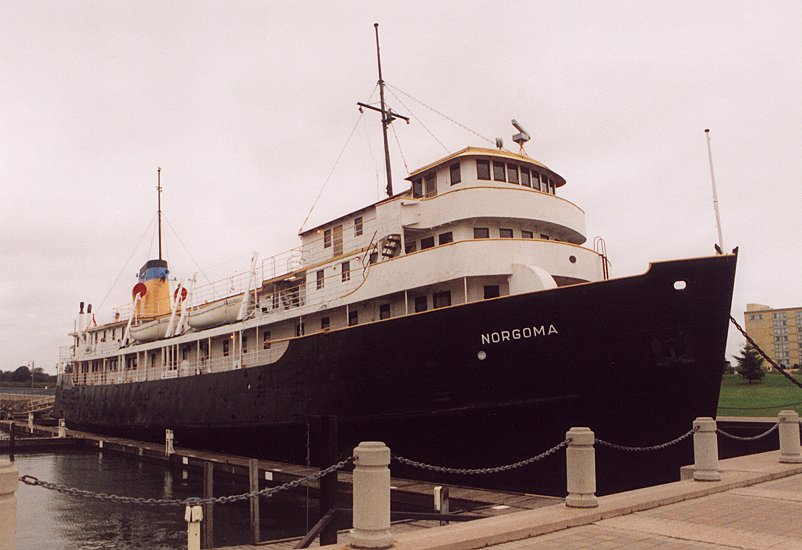
The SS Norgoma was launched in 1950, one year prior to the Dunn takeover of CSL.

In 1944, Dunn was invited to serve on the board of directors of Canada Steamship Lines (CSL), whose ore carriers were an important transporter of ore and coal for the Algoma Steel plant which operated under a geographical disadvantage to its more southerly competitors. Unhappy over CSL's policy of prioritizing service to his steel mill's competition on the lower section of the Great Lakes, with backing from a Winnipeg, Manitoba businessman plus the Montreal publishing magnate, John Wilson McConnell, James Dunn quietly set about buying up shares of the shipping line. He secured a line of credit from the Bank of Montreal and through Earle McLaughlin at the Royal Bank of Canada he raised a war chest that saw him gain effective control of Canada Steamship Lines in 1951. This was followed up by the acquisition of another shipping line with cargo vessels capable of cost-effective delivery of Algoma Steel's products to the southern markets. Within a few years, Dunn was exporting iron ore from his Algoma Ore Properties Limited to American buyers.

== Art collection ==
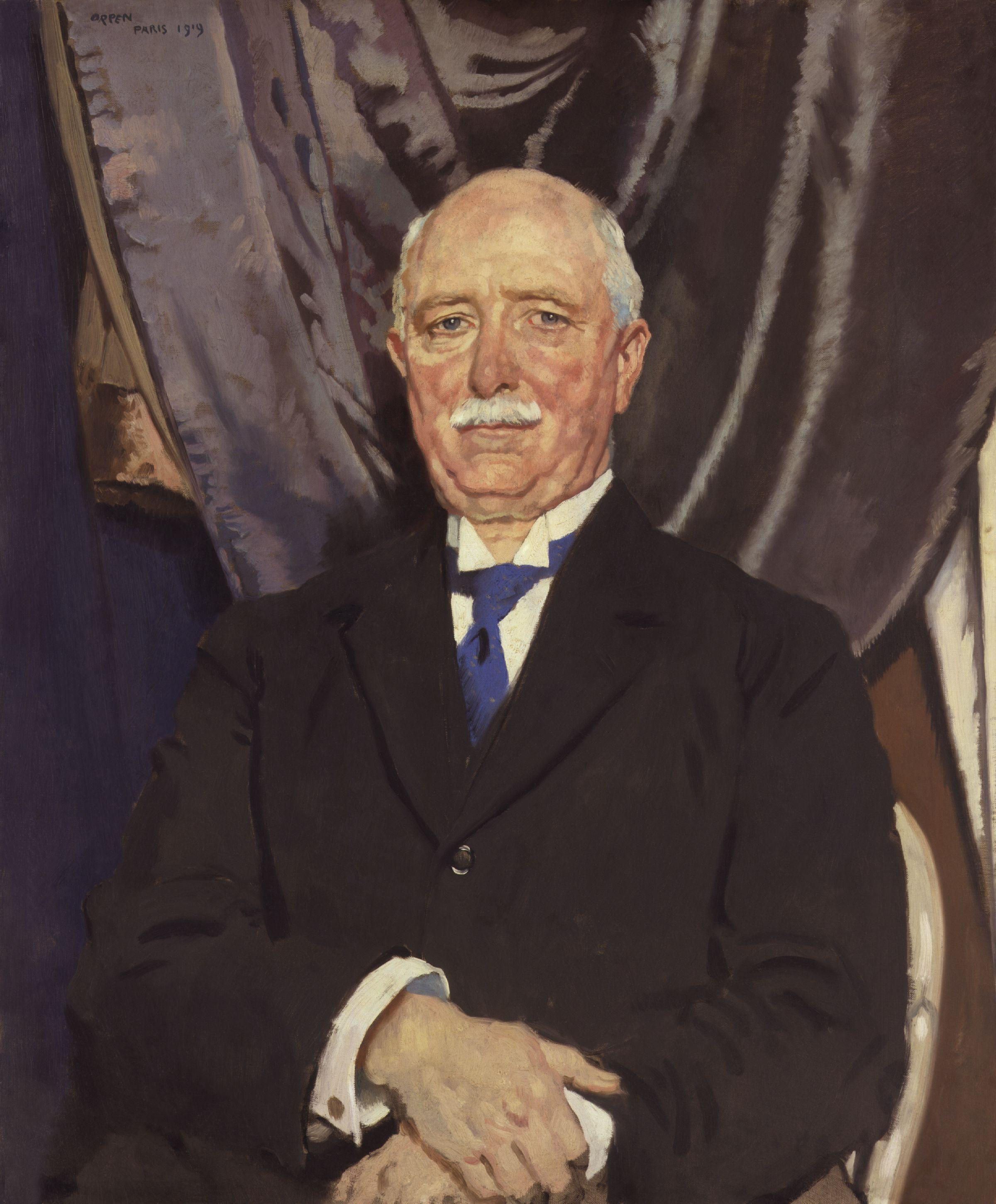
One of seventeen portraits by Sir William Orpen, which were commissioned by Dunn, of the settlors of the Treaty of Versailles at the Paris Peace Conference of 1919: William Ferguson Massey, at the time Premier of New Zealand.

Sir James Dunn had been an avid art collector for many years. He was introduced to this pastime by van Horne in 1908, and purchased three paintings by Goya before 1911, and a Velazquez by 1912. Dunn was pained when forced by the Fischer debacle to liquidate his art collection in 1914. The transaction included 13 paintings and included Holbein, Bronzino, Manet and El Greco.

Dunn commissioned seventeen portraits of participants at the Versailles Conference by Sir William Orpen, amongst whom were Woodrow Wilson and George Barnes. At the height of the depression, commissioned another dozen, this time of his friends like Lord Greenwood, Lord Castlerosse and Lord Beaverbrook, by a down-on-his-luck Sickert.

In the late 1940s, he and Christofor, Lady Dunn, developed a friendship with Salvador Dalí. The artist went on to paint the portraits of the couple (Gala-Salvador Dalí Foundation)(Gala-Salvador Dalí Foundation) which are now on permanent display at the Beaverbrook Art Gallery in Fredericton, New Brunswick along with one of Dalí's greatest pieces, the "Santiago el Grande." As well, the art gallery received other works of art that the Dunns collected including a 1650 painting by Jakob van Loo titled "A Gentleman" and the Augustus John picture, "Dorelia" as well as John's portrait of Sir James Dunn.

== Personal ==
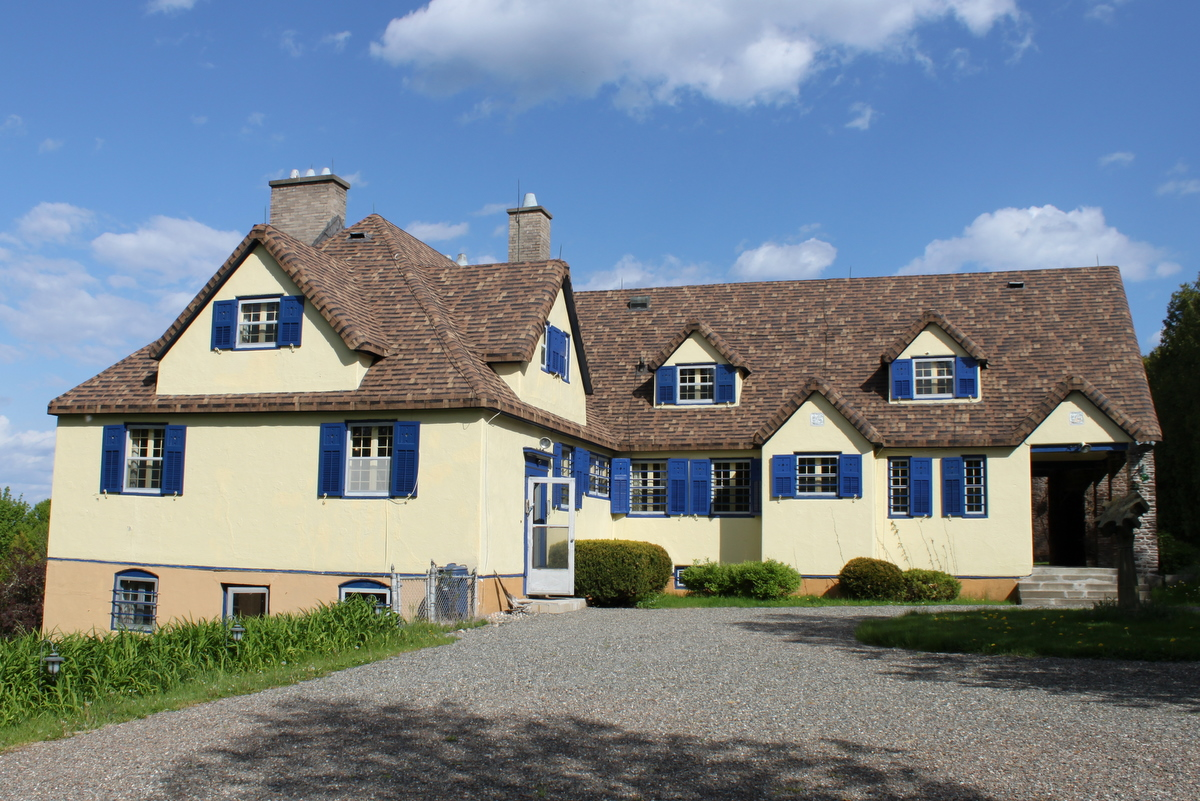
Dayspring, Dunn's home at St. Andrews.

In 1901, James Dunn was married to Gertrude Paterson Price, the daughter of a prosperous Quebec City lumber dealer. They had five children before divorcing in 1926:

1. Mona Dunn (c. 1902–1928). Widely described as 'the most beautiful girl in England' she became at 17 when he met her in Paris in 1919 the mistress of Lord Birkenhead, who was then Lord Chancellor in the Coalition Cabinet of David Lloyd George. She married in 1925 Edmund Tattersall, a war hero of the 5th Dragoon Guards with whom she had in May 1927 a daughter, Monica. Her portrait by William Orpen hangs in the Beaverbrook Art Gallery, Fredericton, New Brunswick, Canada, and may be viewed on their web-site. Her early death on 19 December 1928 from peritonitis was a crushing blow to her father. It became the subject of an occasional poem by Shane Leslie, which was published by the Ashendene Press.
2. Sir Philip Gordon Dunn, 2nd Baronet Dunn (1905–1976), who was father of two daughters: the author Nell Dunn, and Serena Dunn, later Lady Rothschild.
3. Kathleen Mabel Dunn (1907–1969) - she married stockbroker Peter Higgins but the couple were divorced. She married in 1947 Colonel Sir Robert Philip Wyndham Adeane, O.B.E. (1905–79), kt., of Babraham Hall.
4. Joan Molesworth Dunn (1908–1982) who married 1928 (and was divorced 1 November 1929 by) Hubert Duggan, an MP, and stepson of Lord Curzon. Upon her divorce she lost custody of an infant child born on 5 August 1929. She next married her lover Anthony Jenkinson, who subsequently committed suicide in October 1935. She married last in 1943, Charles Dutton, 7th Baron Sherborne.
5. Brigid Leila Dunn (1919–1991)

Following the divorce from his first wife in 1926, Sir James Dunn married Irene Clarice Richards, the former wife of Francis Archibald Kelhead Douglas, 11th Marquess of Queensberry. The 1928 death of his daughter Mona Dunn from his first marriage sent him into a state of depression and for a time he thought about cutting back on his business activities and returning home to his native New Brunswick. However, in 1929, his new wife gave birth to a daughter, Anne, who lifted his spirits a great deal. Anne Dunn grew up to be an artist, studying under Henry Moore and in Paris, France with Fernand Léger and at the Académie Julian. Nevertheless, Dunn and his second wife divorced in 1942 following which he married his long-time personal secretary, Marcia Anastasia Christoforides. Thirty-six years his junior, "Christofor" as she was nicknamed, was very bright, intensely loyal, and a devoted partner. James Dunn would seek her input on most every business matter for the rest of his life.

Although a workaholic, Dunn enjoyed luxury and maintained an active social life. He was one of the first businessman to acquire a Douglas DC-3 as a private business aircraft, in which he traveled frequently between his homes in Europe and Canada. He kept a vast wine cellar from the vineyards of France and frequented New York City, especially Broadway where he was a friend of television host Ed Sullivan.

It was for his service in the Great War that Dunn was knighted in the 1921 New Year's List of Honours. Dunn functioned as a sort of emissary for two Prime Ministers. He first responded when Asquith asked him (and members of the Asquith family) in the autumn of 1914 to write a report on the Army hospital service behind the lines in France. Next, he negotiated with Jacob Borreson an agreement that all of the nickel mined by the Kristiansand Nickel Company of Norway would be sent to Canada for smelting and refining. The British government obtained a virtual blockade on the supply of nickel to Germany, which was forced to purchase nickel from afar (with all the risk entailed by a distant supply) at inflated "spot" prices. Lloyd George requested a situation report from Dunn on the disrupted supply of foodstuffs from Norway, Sweden and Denmark; Dunn's plans for increasing the supply were sound and worked admirably in practice.

In 1949, Dunn was made a King's Counsel in Quebec by Maurice Duplessis. He was a made a member of the bar in five provinces. On 15 August 1950, he was made a Freeman of the City of Bathurst, and in November 1954 the same honour was bestowed by St. Andrews, New Brunswick. The University of New Brunswick, Dalhousie University, St. Francis Xavier University, Laval University and Queen's University all granted him honorary degrees. Sault Sainte Marie awarded him the Freedom of the City.

In January 1956 at the age of 81, after a heart ailment of less than a week Dunn died at his home in St. Andrews, New Brunswick. In commemoration of his birthday, in the same year, Lady Dunn privately published The Ballad of a Bathurst Boy: 1874-1956, a celebration of her late husband's life in verse. Printed by the University of New Brunswick Press in Fredericton, NB, it was sent to friends and family of Dunn. His widow sold the 10,000 acre camp he had acquired near his birthplace the next year. One source places this parcel on Dunn Road near Allardville, New Brunswick.

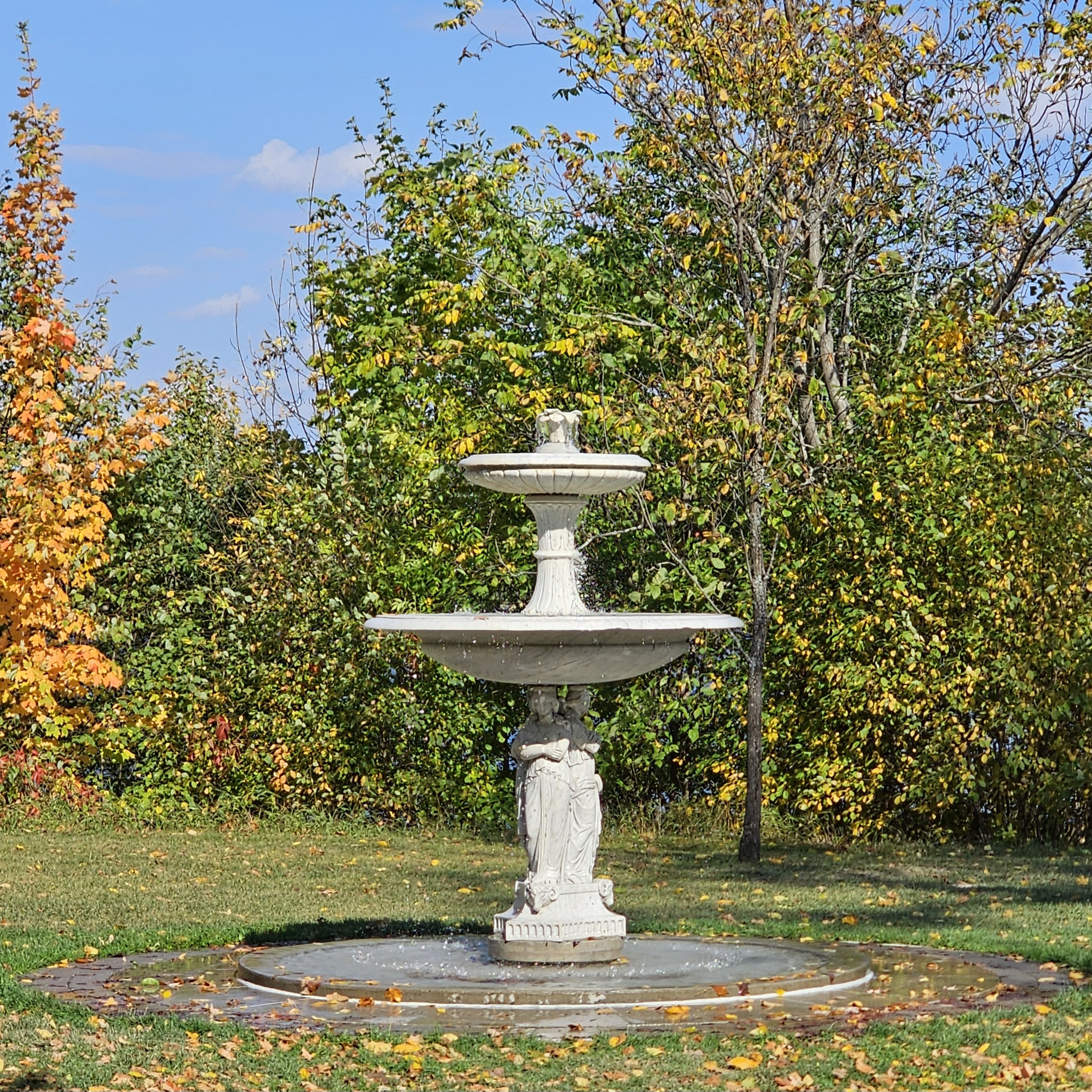
A fountain in Dunn's honor was gifted by Lord Beaverbrook to the city of Fredericton.

Lord Beaverbrook (Max Aitken) published in 1961 a detailed biography of his late friend, titled Courage: The Story of Sir James Dunn. The most complete telling of Dunn's life and business career is available in Duncan McDowall's, Steel at the Sault: Francis H. Clergue, Sir James Dunn and the Algoma Steel Corporation 1901-1956 (Toronto:University of Toronto Press, hb 1984 & pb 1988).

At the time of his death, Dunn was president of Algoma Ore Properties Ltd, Cannelton Coal and Coke Company, Fiborn Limestone Company, and Canadian Furnace Company.

== Legacy ==
As a result of the very substantial taxes on the estate left by Sir James Dunn and Nova Scotia's Izaak Walton Killam who had died the year before in 1955, the government of Canada was able to create and provide an endowment for the Canada Council for the Arts. Dunn also left a very significant estate to his last wife who fulfilled his wishes and made numerous contributions to charitable, cultural, and educational works.

Perhaps Dunn's most significant legacy was the discovery of a productive ore near Bathurst, which was exploited by as many as 700 men for half a century from 1953: One of the annual scholarships, that were provided by Dunn in 1947 to the University of New Brunswick, was awarded to a Master's student by the name of A.B. Baldwin, who discovered the ore as his thesis work and thus "greatly enlarged the bounds of provincial prosperity". In fact, Dunn had specified in the deed that the scholarship was to be awarded for only New Brunswick geological work; Baldwin, who was originally interested in samples from Quebec's North Shore, was led by the Dunn gift to examine ore from New Brunswick.

As used here, the James Hamet Dunn legacy includes not only the bequests of his estate, but also significant charitable gifts that he made during his lifetime, and may no longer exist. Two examples from his hometown suffice to demonstrate his essence:

- The James Hamet Dunn Hospital in West Bathurst, New Brunswick was consumed by flames in February 1953 after more than forty years' existence. The hospital initiated in northern New Brunswick a school for nurses.
- In May 1931, the Our Lady of Lourdes of the Lady Dunn Institution sanatorium for the care of tuberculosis patients was opened north of Bathurst. It was managed by the Religious Hospitallers of St. Joseph, and later demolished to become the state-financed Chaleur Regional Hospital.

A number of foundations, buildings and academic Chairs bear (or bore) his name including:

- the Sir James Dunn Jubilee Scholarship at Mount Saint Vincent University in Halifax, Nova Scotia;
- the Sir James Dunn Wildlife Research Fund of the University of New Brunswick;
- the Sir James Dunn Residence at the University of New Brunswick, Saint John campus
- at Saint Thomas University, Fredericton, New Brunswick:
  - the Sir James Dunn Hall and
  - the Sir James Dunn Student Lounge
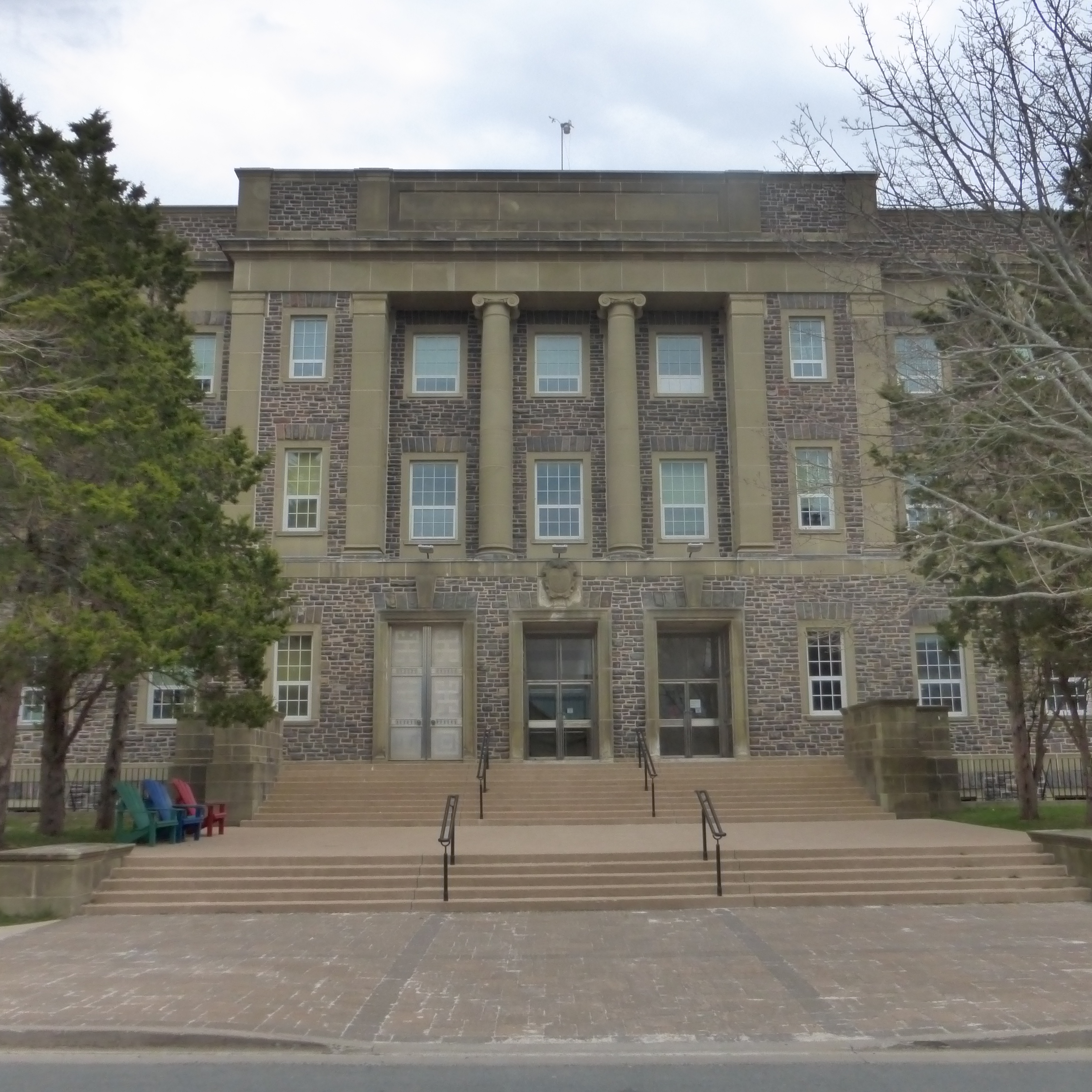
    The Sir James Dunn building at Dalhousie University.
- at Dalhousie University in Halifax, Nova Scotia:
  - a chair in Law;
  - the Sir James Dunn Law Library,
  - the Sir James Dunn Building for Physics & Atmospheric Science, and
  - the Sir James Dunn Theatre at the Arts Center;
- at Mount Allison University in Sackville, New Brunswick:
  - the Sir James Dunn Chair in Geology and
  - the Sir James Dunn Building for the computer science, mathematics and physics departments;
- the Sir James Dunn Animal Welfare Centre at the University of Prince Edward Island;
- at Queen's University:
  - a Chair in mining.

In addition, Sir James Dunn has been honoured with numerous buildings and institutions bearing his name such as:

- The Sir James Dunn Academy, a high school in St. Andrews, New Brunswick funded after his death by his last wife;
- The Former Sir James Dunn Collegiate and Vocational School in Sault Ste. Marie, Ontario;
- The Sir James Dunn, a bulk carrier ship (Hull #109) launched in 1951, for Canada Steamship Lines;
- The Sir James Dunn Public School in Wawa, Ontario, once Algoma's source for iron ore;
- the Lady Dunn Hospital in Michipicoten (now Wawa, Ontario);
- The Sir James Dunn Highland Guard of Honor the only highland cadet guard in the Canadian Cadet Movement, attached to 333 RCACS Fredericton NB.

Sir James was a member of the committee that built and opened London's first public golf courses in Richmond Park, which were opened in 1923 and 1925.

== Notes ==
Baronetage of the United Kingdom
New creation	Baronet (of Bathurst); 1921–1956	Succeeded by Philip Dunn
