= St. Mary's Paper =

Coordinates: 46°30′56″N 84°20′55″W

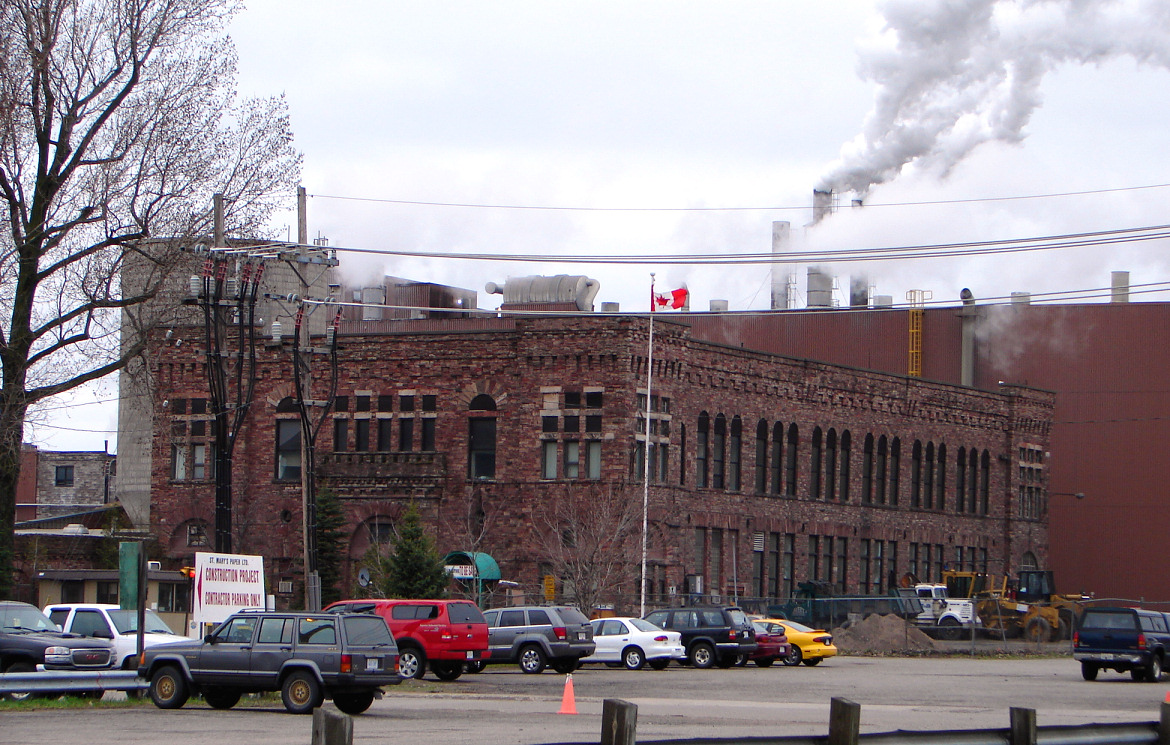
St Marys Paper

St. Marys Paper Ltd. was a manufacturer of pulp and paper, with its mill located in Sault Ste. Marie, Ontario, Canada. The mill was situated on the St. Marys River waterfront, just east of Algoma Steel.

== History ==
=== Formation ===
The pulp mill was originally established as the "Sault Ste. Marie Pulp and Paper Company" in 1895 by Francis Clergue. It was located on the site of a Northwest Company trading post that was established in 1874.

Clergue also incorporated the "Ontario Pulp and Paper Company" to operate a parallel mill for newsprint production.

Following the collapse of the Clergue industrial empire in 1903, it closed for several months before being operated in receivership until 1905. The Clergue companies became part of the Lake Superior Corporation in 1904, which arranged for the transfer of the assets of the Sault Ste. Marie Pulp and Paper Company to the Lake Superior Paper Company Ltd. in 1911. Lake Superior Paper amalgamated with Spanish River Pulp & Paper Mills in 1917, which operated the mill until the Abitibi Power and Paper Company purchased it in 1928.

The mill was acquired by St Marys Paper Inc. from Abitibi in 1984, for which loan guarantees were secured from the Government of Canada. St Marys Paper was controlled by a private investor, Dan Alexander, who arranged to invest heavily in a fifth paper machine.

=== Operation ===
St. Mary's Paper operated a supercalendar grade paper mill with three paper machines, with a total annual capacity of 240,000 tons.

It produced SCA premium, SCA and SCB paper grades under the trade names Sequence, Sequel and Synpress. Paper produced at the mill was primarily purchased by magazine publishers and large retail companies for high quality advertising inserts, flyers and catalogues.

=== Hard times and restructurings ===
St Mary's Paper, in common with the rest of the pulp and paper industry in Canada, had been facing many adverse economic factors in recent years, arising from international economic trends, provincial policies and changing technology. This resulted in three successive restructurings between 1993 and 2012:

- The company declared bankruptcy in April 1993 and was operated for several years by Ernst & Young. Belgravia Investments (Note: now known as Stern Partners Inc.) purchased the mill in 1994 and made the facility viable with the assistance of the employees, the Ontario government and the Toronto-Dominion Bank.
- In October 2006, it filed for bankruptcy protection under the Companies' Creditors Arrangement Act in Toronto. In June 2007, the mill was reopened under new ownership and began making paper again for its customers in the United States. However, pensioners saw their benefits reduced by 20%. In order to assure operations, St. Mary's entered into financing, supply and exclusive distribution agreements with International Forest Products. (Note: a subsidiary of the Kraft Group)
- Despite these efforts, which also included $25 million in startup funding from IFP and the Government of Ontario, the mill was unable to resume significant activity, and went idle once more in 2011. In December 2011, IFP applied to place the company into receivership, and a bankruptcy order was subsequently issued in June 2012. E&Y, acting as trustee in bankruptcy, reported that the realization of funds from the sale of assets would be insufficient to pay off liabilities due to the secured creditors. Acting as receiver, it proceeded to sell off all assets.

=== Site redevelopment ===
In 2013, the site was purchased by Riversedge Developments, a real estate developer which announced plans to convert the site into a mixed-use cultural and tourism hub through adaptive reuse of the most historically and architecturally significant buildings. Dubbed Mill Square, current plans for the site include the new home of the Algoma Conservatory of Music, a performance and arts venue, a bioenergy plant and Destination North, a cultural and tourism "hub" project that will incorporate interactive museum exhibits, a farmer's market and a new terminus for the Agawa Canyon Railway tour. The main building now houses a restaurant (The Mill Steak House), 2 pubs (The Boiler Room and The Steamfitter's Lounge), and a gelato/coffee shop (The Gelato Mill), along with the performance venue and conservatory. The facility is branded as The Machine Shop.

In 2015, parts of the area were purchased by The Tech including The Yard (outdoor music venue) and The Yard Locker.

== Image gallery ==
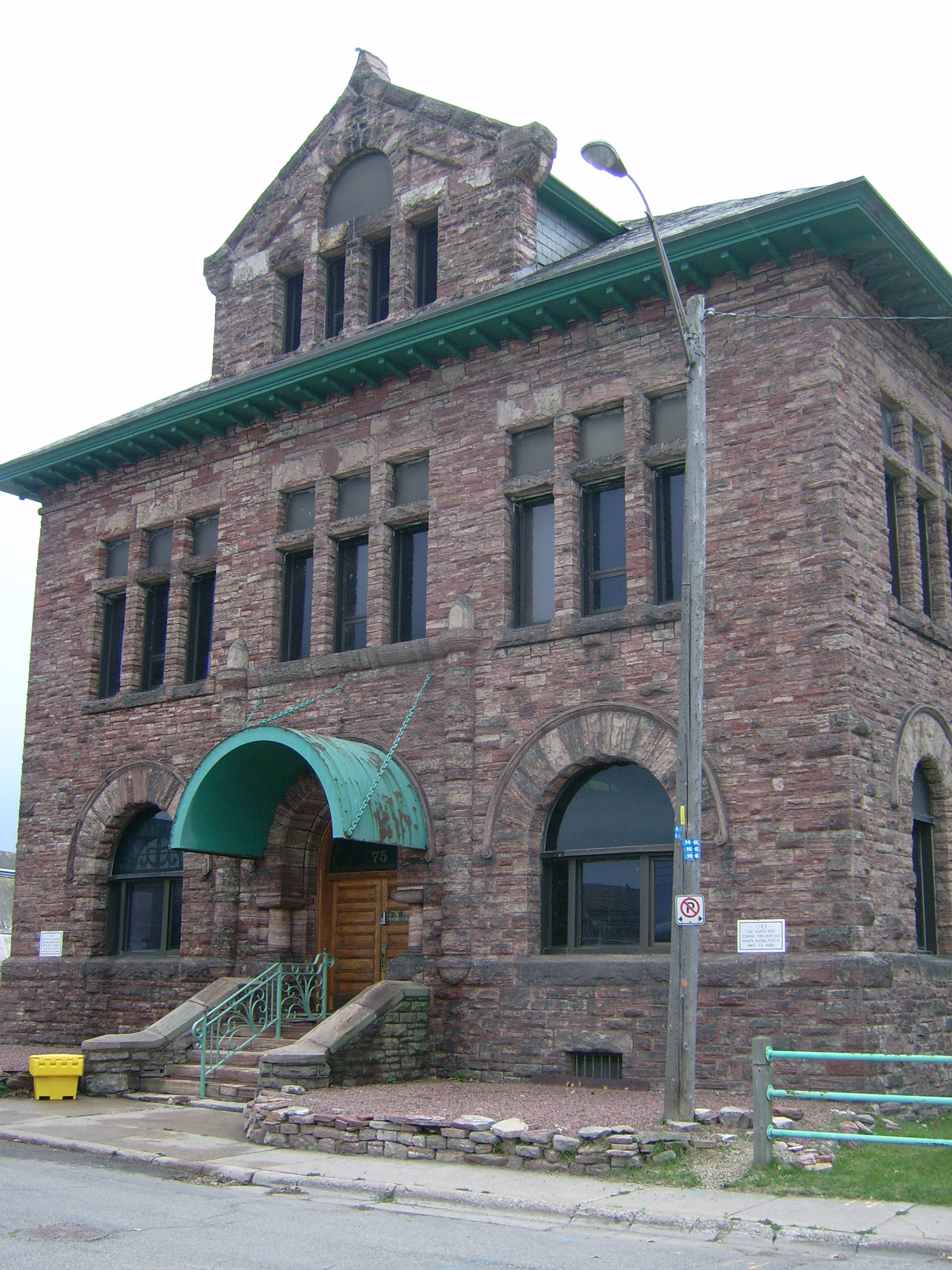
Abitibi-Price head office

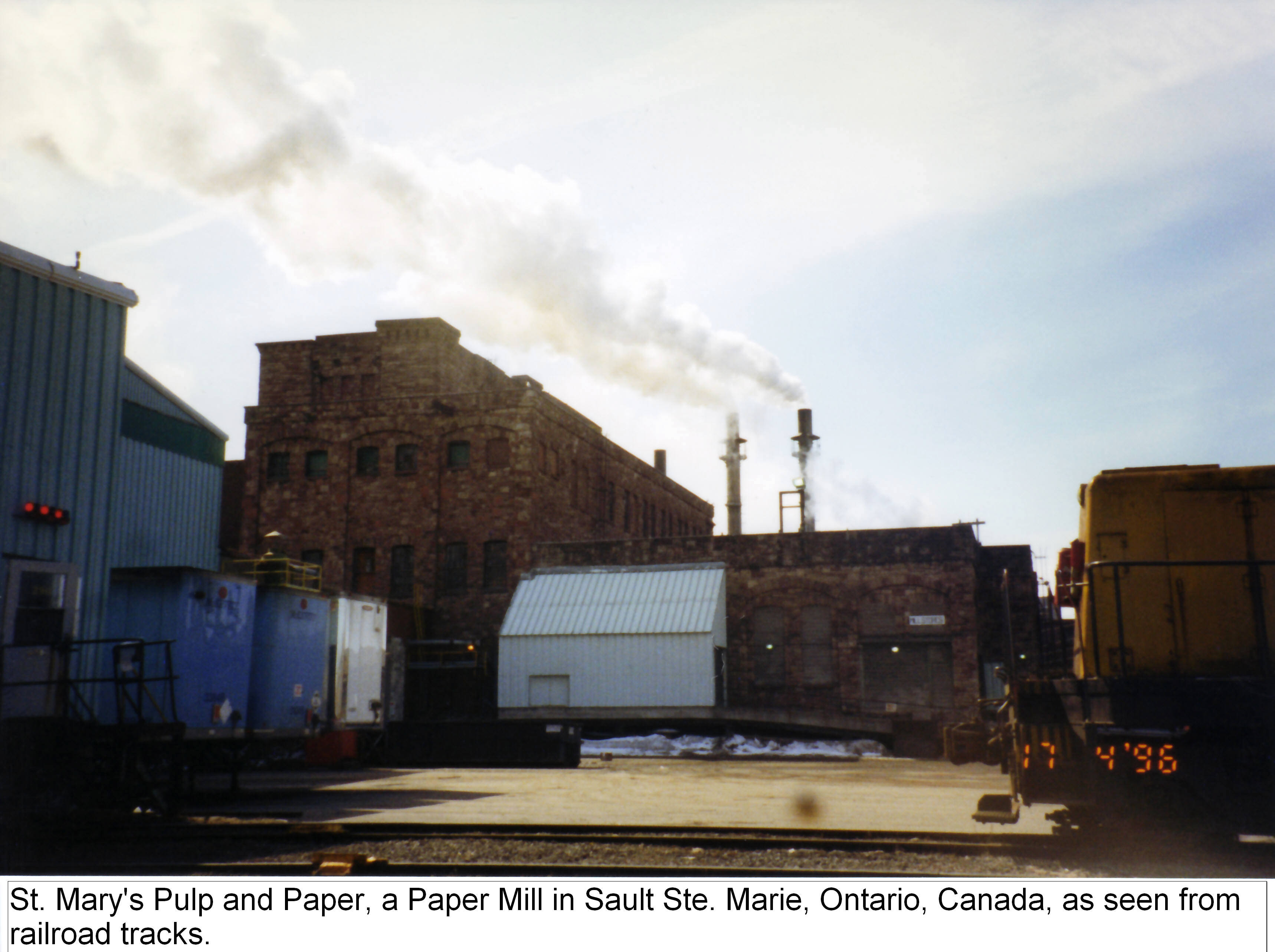
Back of mill, as seen from tracks

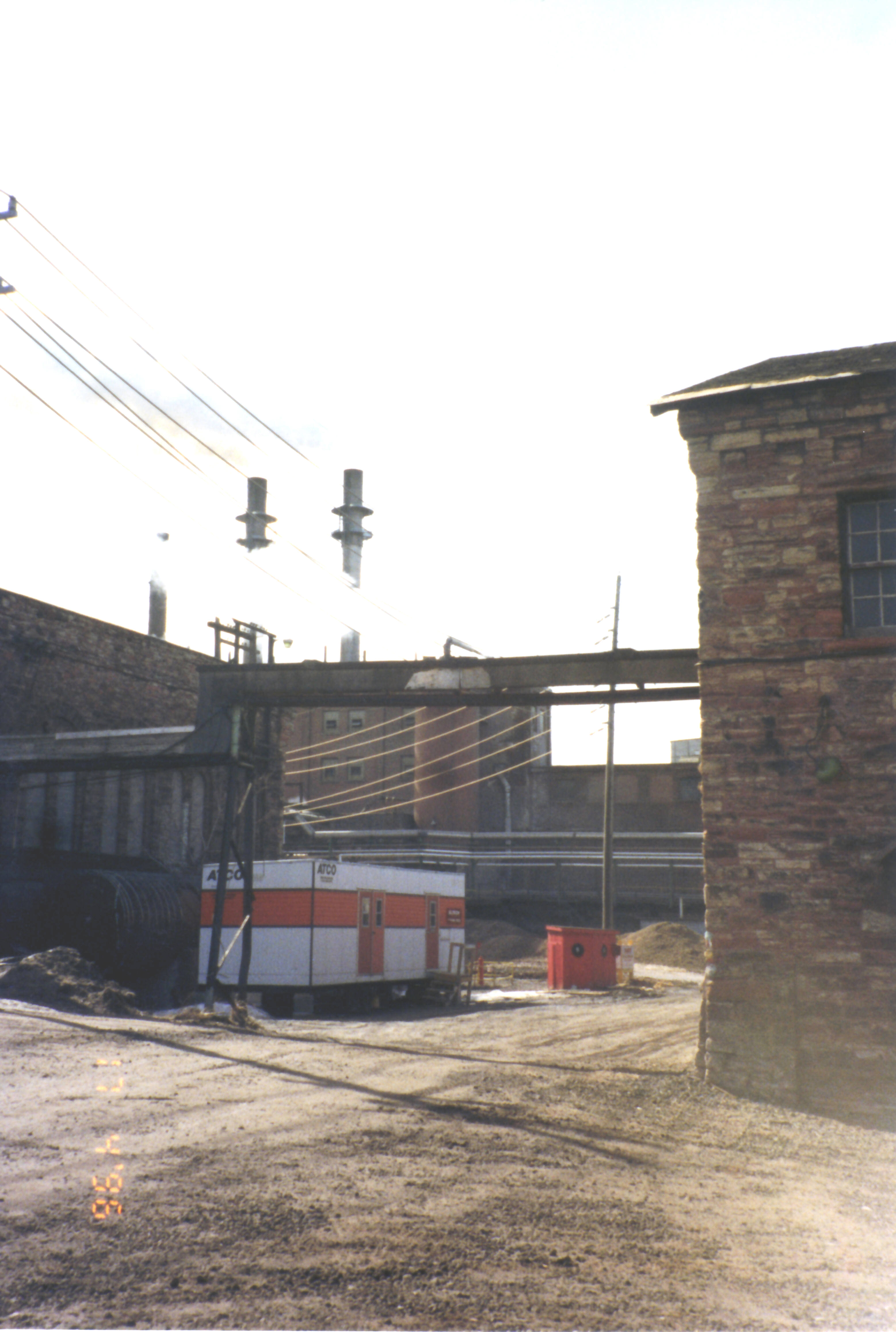
ATCO construction trailer on mill grounds in 1996

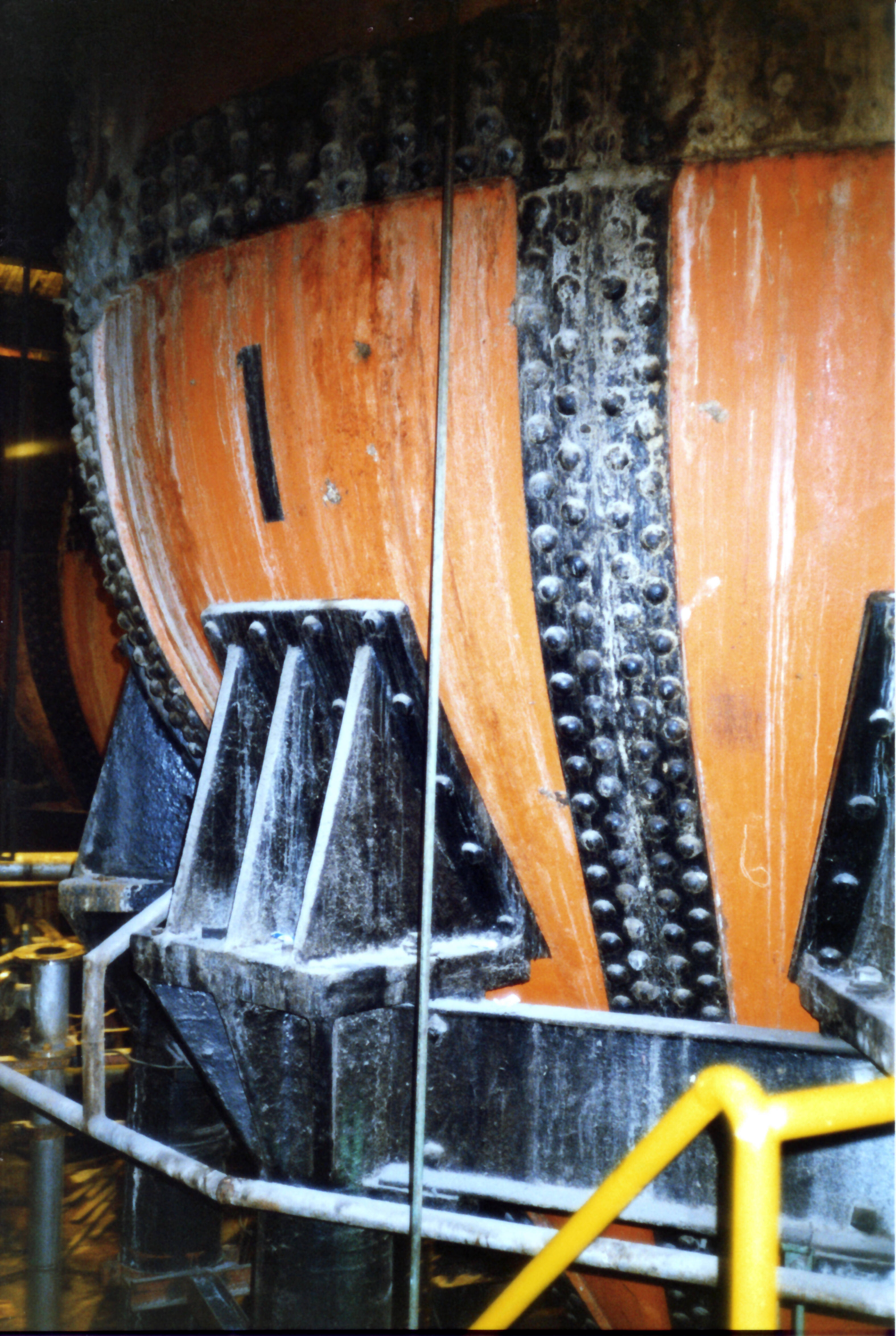
Vessel inside mill

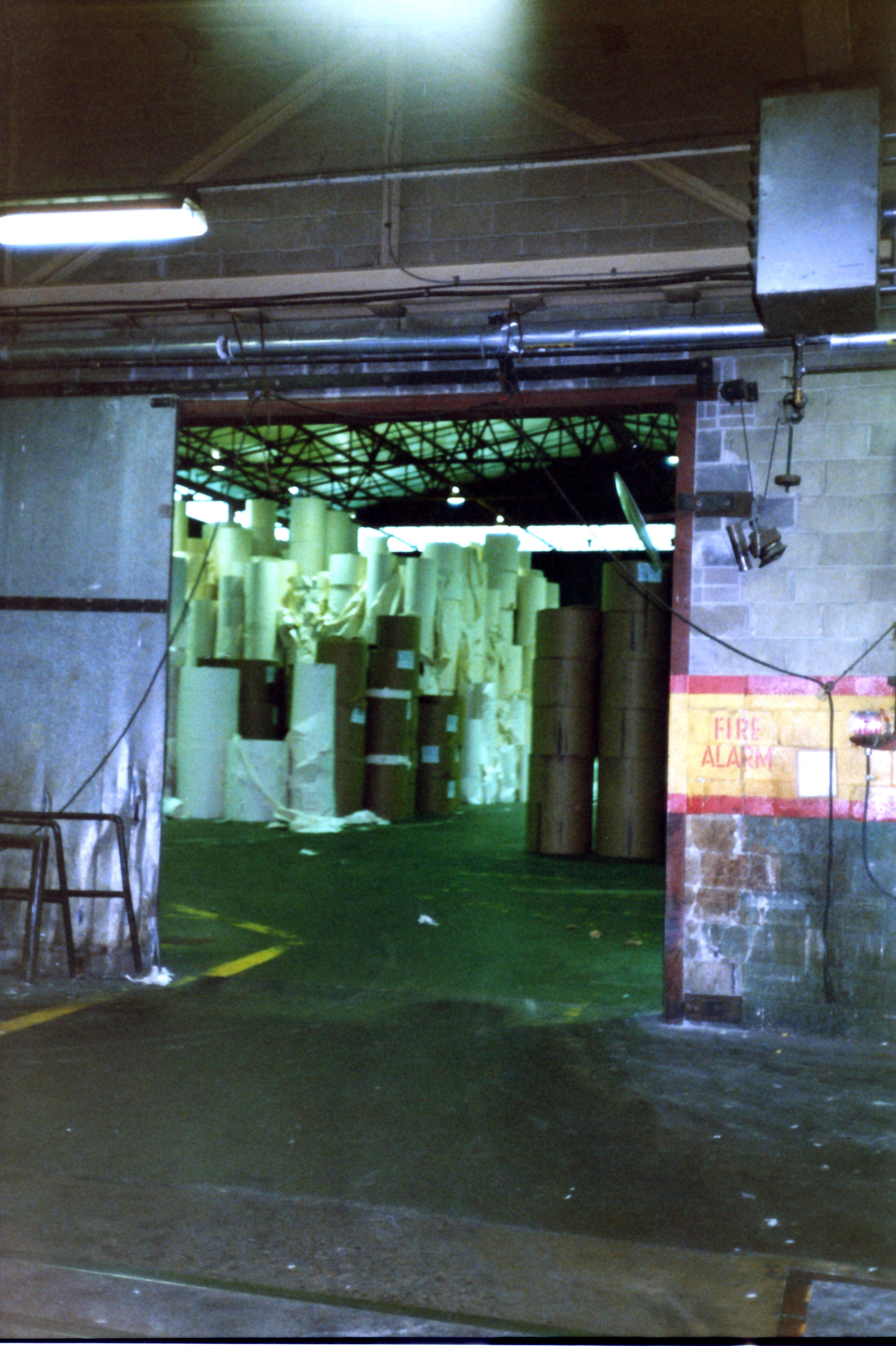
Paper storage

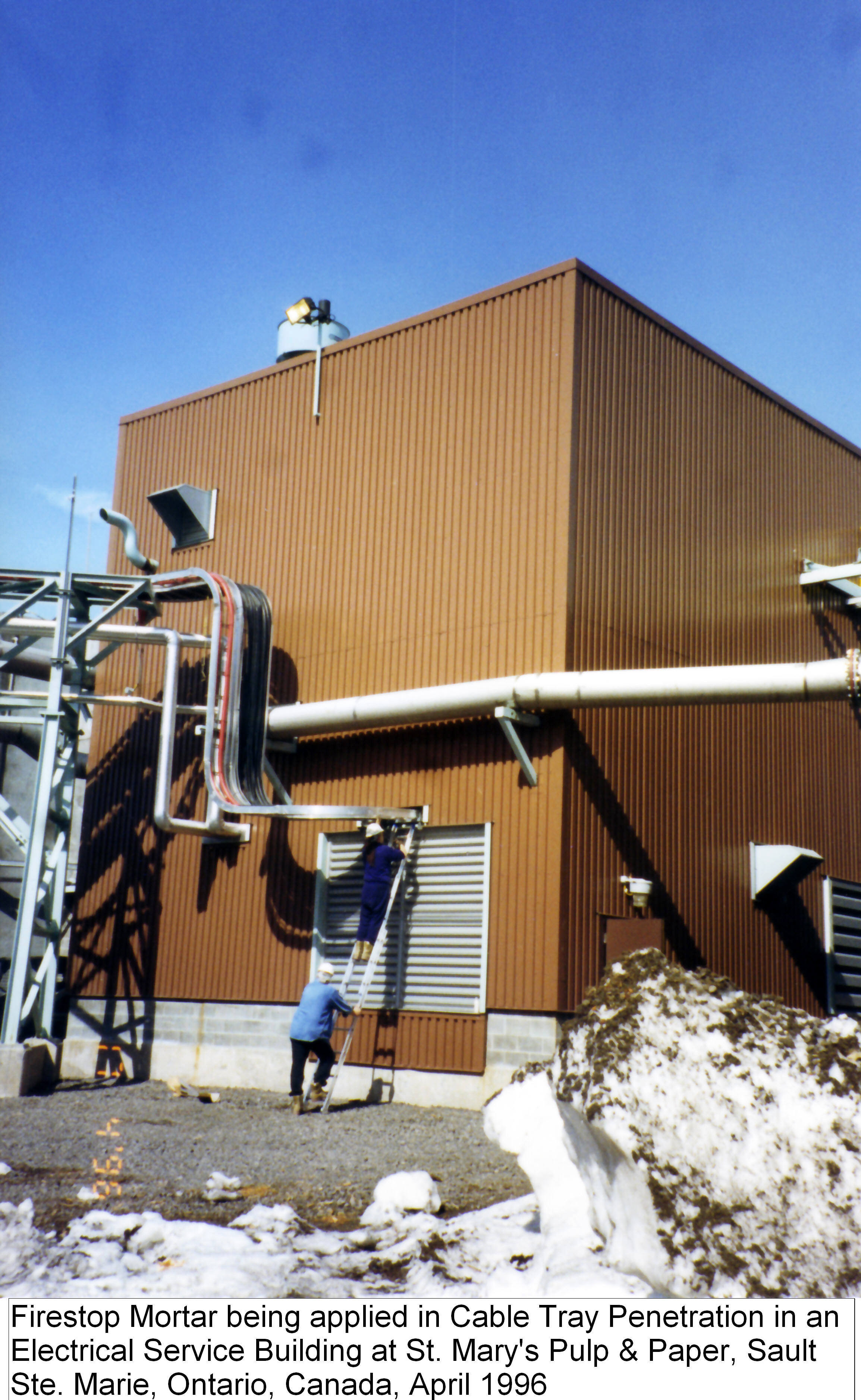
Outlying service building

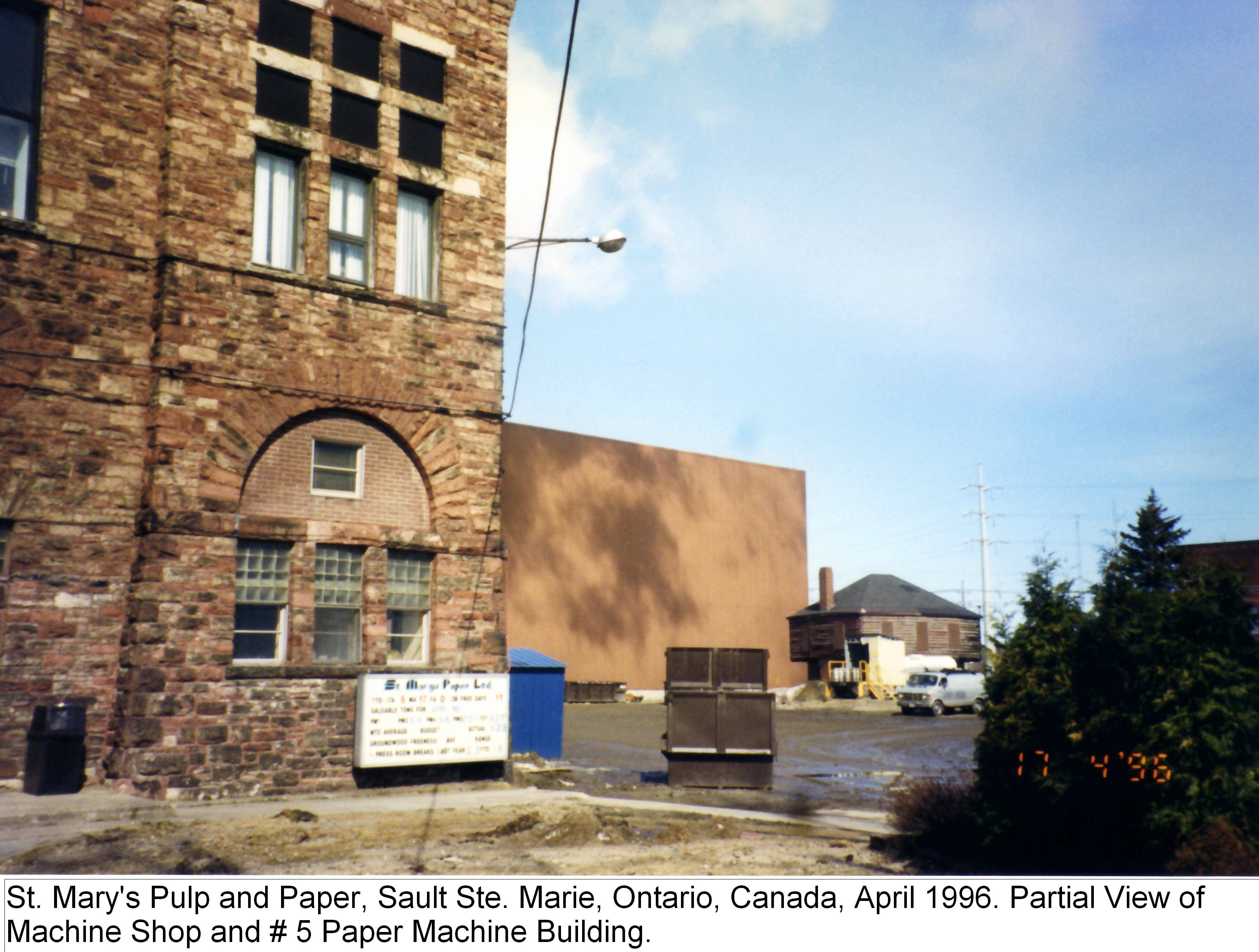
Machine Shop near #5PM

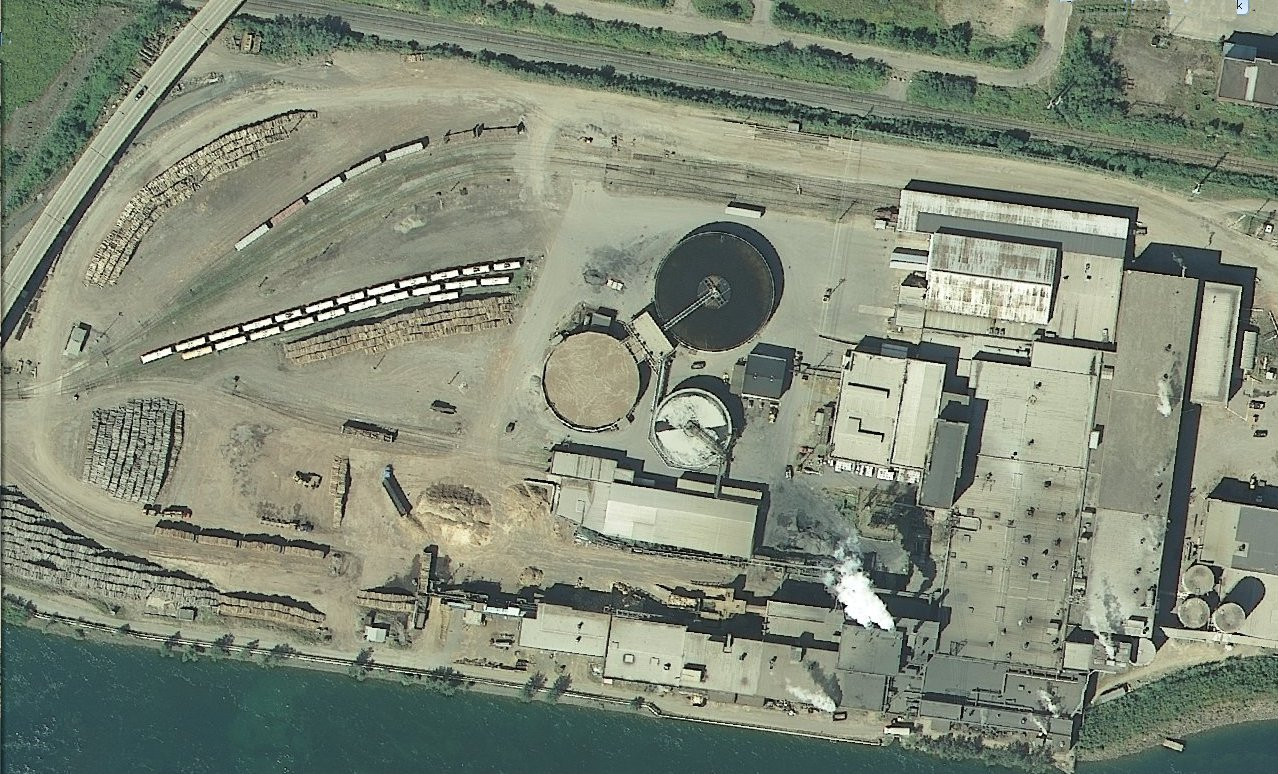
Overhead view from an American satellite
