= Dunn baronets =

Extinct baronetcy in the Baronetage of the United Kingdom

There have been three creations of baronetcies for people with the surname Dunn; all three were in the Baronetage of the United Kingdom.

The first was settled on William Dunn, of The Retreat in the Parish of Lakenheath in the County of Suffolk on 29 July 1895, after whom the Sir William Dunn Professor of Biochemistry and the Sir William Dunn School of Pathology at Oxford University are named. This creation became extinct upon his death in 1912.

A second creation was made on 25 June 1917 for Sir William Henry Dunn, of Clitheroe in the County Palatine of Lancaster, Lord Mayor of London. This creation became extinct upon the death of the second baronet in 1971.

The third and final creation was on 13 January 1921 for James Hamet Dunn, of Bathurst in the Province of New Brunswick in Canada, the Canadian financier and industrialist. This creation became extinct in 1976.

== Dunn baronets, of Lakenheath (1895) ==
- Sir William Dunn, 1st Baronet (1833–1912)

== Dunn baronets, of Clitheroe (1917) ==
- Sir William Dunn, 1st Baronet (1856–1926)
- Sir John Henry Dunn, 2nd Baronet (1890–1971)

== Dunn baronets, of Bathurst (1921) ==
- Sir James Hamet Dunn, 1st Baronet (1874–1956)
- Sir Philip Gordon Dunn, 2nd Baronet (26 October 1905 – 20 June 1976). Dunn was an Anglo-Canadian businessman, landowner and farmer. He was the second child and only son of the wealthy Canadian financier and steel magnate Sir James Hamet Dunn, 1st Baronet, and his first wife, Gertrude Paterson Price. He had four sisters, as well as a half-sister, the artist Anne Dunn, from his father's second marriage. In 1933, Dunn married Lady Mary Sybil St. Clair-Erskine, daughter of James St Clair-Erskine, 5th Earl of Rosslyn, with whom he had two daughters: Serena Mary (born 28 April 1934), who married Jacob Rothschild, 4th Baron Rothschild; and Nell Mary, Mrs. Jeremy Sandford (born 9 June 1936), who became a playwright and author. The baronetcy became extinct on Dunn's death in 1976.
