= Algoma Steel =

Integrated primary steel producer in Canada

Algoma Steel Inc.
- Type: Public
- Traded as: TSX: ASTL; Nasdaq: ASTL
- Industry: Steel
- Founded: 1901; 125 years ago
- Founder: Francis Clergue
- Headquarters: Sault Ste. Marie, Ontario, Canada
- Number of employees: 3500 (2008)
- Website: www.algoma.com

Algoma Steel Inc. (formerly The Algoma Steel Corporation, Limited; Essar Steel Algoma) is an integrated primary steel producer located on the St. Marys River in Sault Ste. Marie, Ontario, Canada. Algoma Steel was founded in 1901 by Francis Clergue, an American entrepreneur who had settled in Sault Ste. Marie. The company is a traditional blast furnace based steel maker that is building an electric arc furnace to produce steel with a lower carbon footprint.

Algoma Steel has been privately owned several times, listed on the Toronto Stock Exchange at least three times; and has been a subsidiary or affiliate of Canadian Pacific Limited (1980s), Dofasco (1988-1991) and Essar Group (2007-2017). Reflecting the challenging environment for Canadian steel makers, Algoma and its predecessor companies have been financially restructured at least four times. Algoma first was in receivership following the Great Depression in 1932; while in recent decades it emerged from bankruptcy protection in 1992 and 2004, and was in creditor protection again in 2015-2018.

In May 2021, it was announced that Algoma "was to become a public company again" as it had agreed a merger with New York–based acquisition firm Legato Merger Corp, which is a NASDAQ-listed special-purpose acquisition company. Following the deal, Algoma listed its shares on the Toronto Stock Exchange for the third time.

== History ==
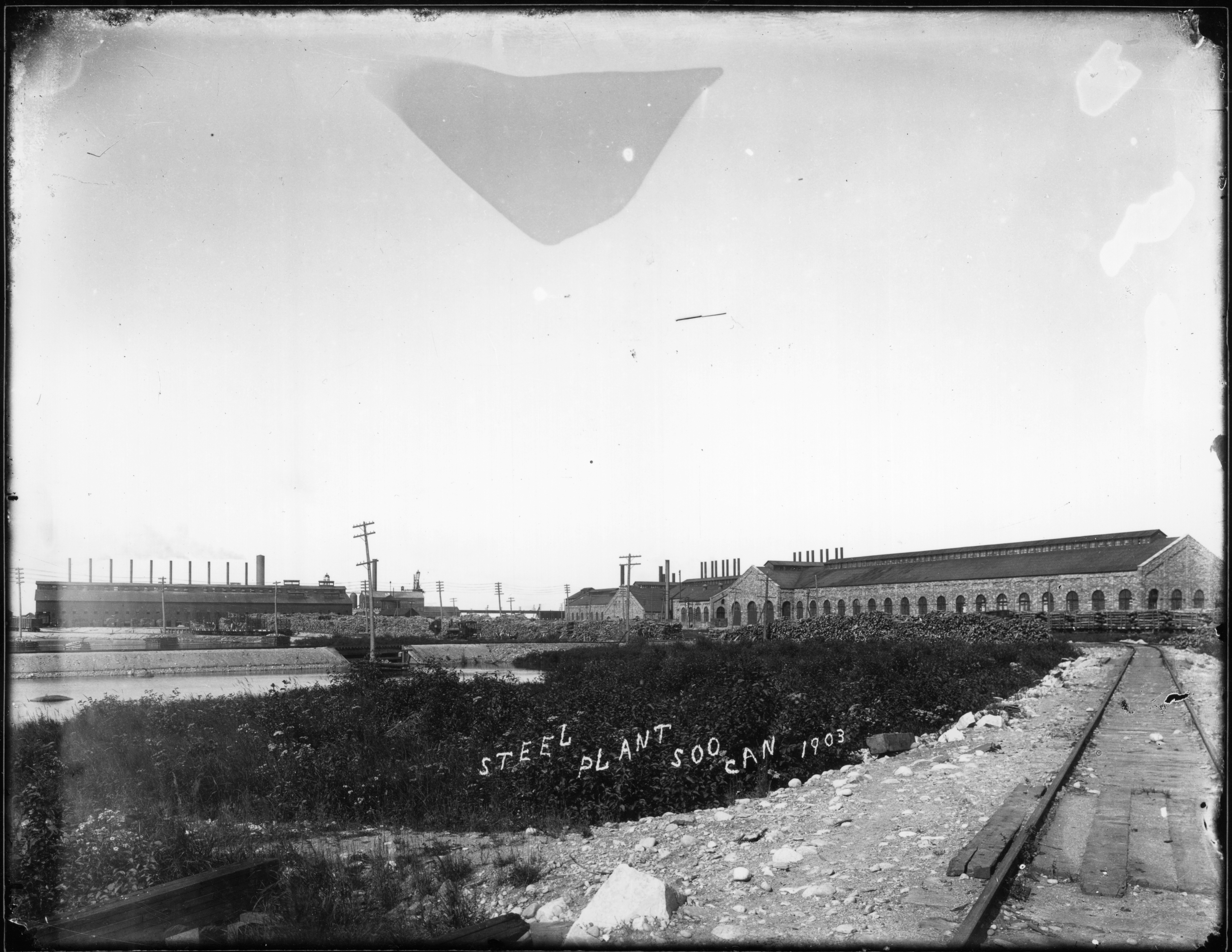
Algoma Steel, 1903

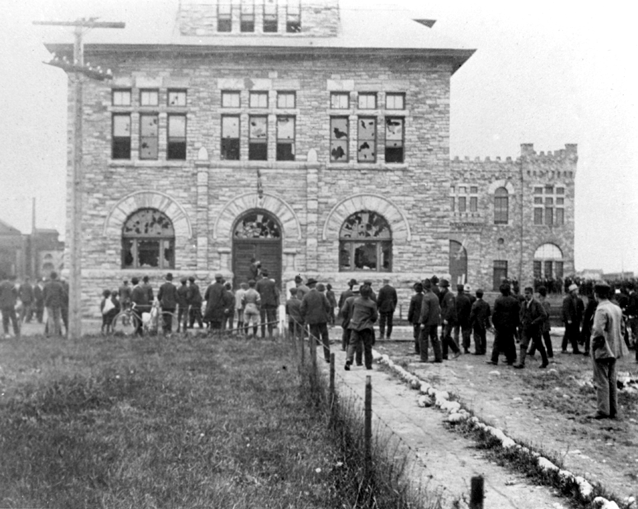
September 1903 riots at Clergue Industries headquarters

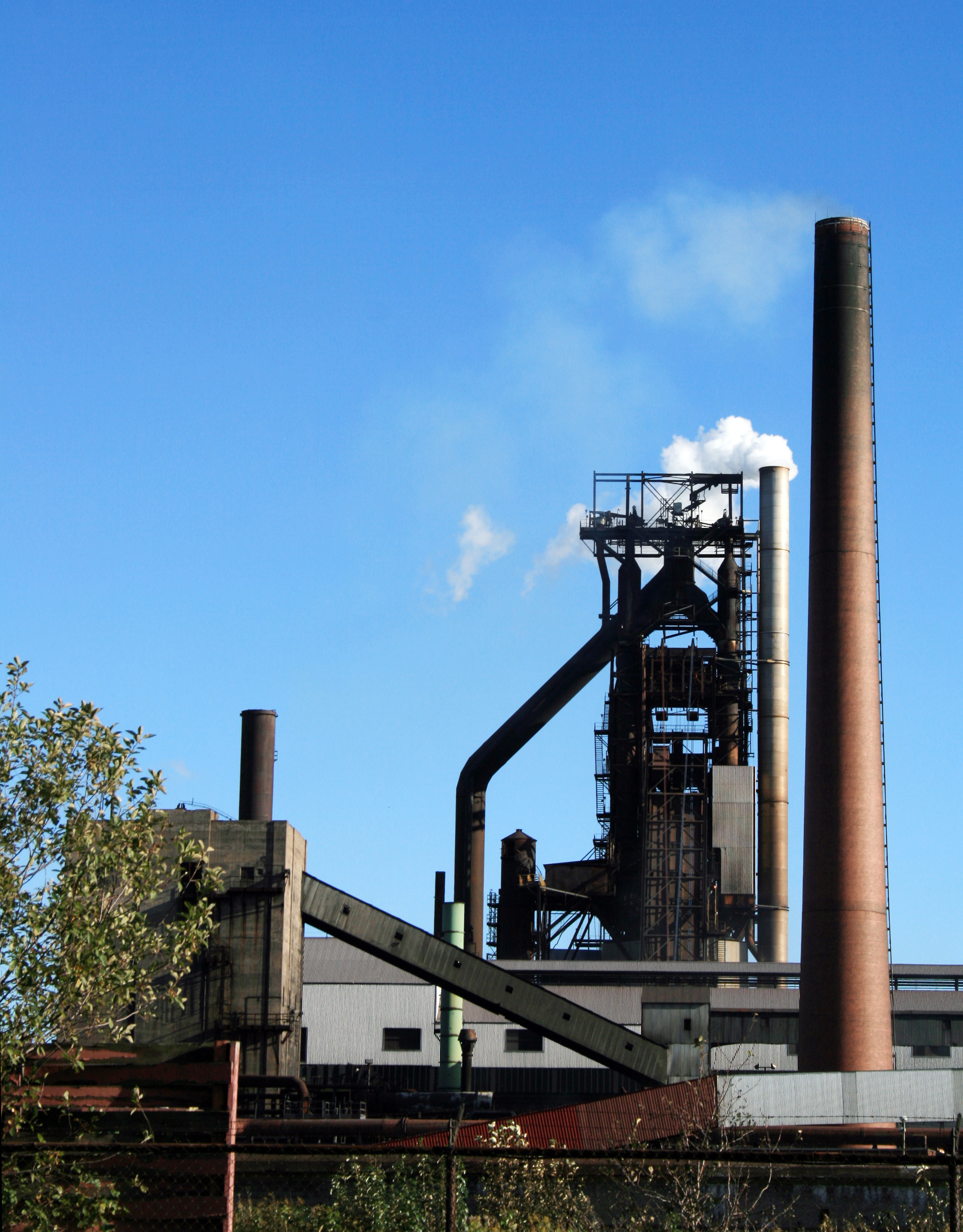
One of the blast furnaces of Essar Steel Algoma

The company was incorporated in 1901 and construction of the steelworks started in February of that year. On February 18, 1902, the first Bessemer converter was put in operation using pig iron made from the Helen mine, owned by Algoma. The first rails were produced by the complex in May 1902. However, blast furnaces for pig iron manufacture were not completed at the site until 1904. Unlike most other steel producers, Algoma had no access to local coal, forcing it to import coal and coke from the United States. The Bessemer process was felt to produce steel that was well-suited to manufacture of rails, which was the Algoma complex's primary product for the first two decades of its existence.

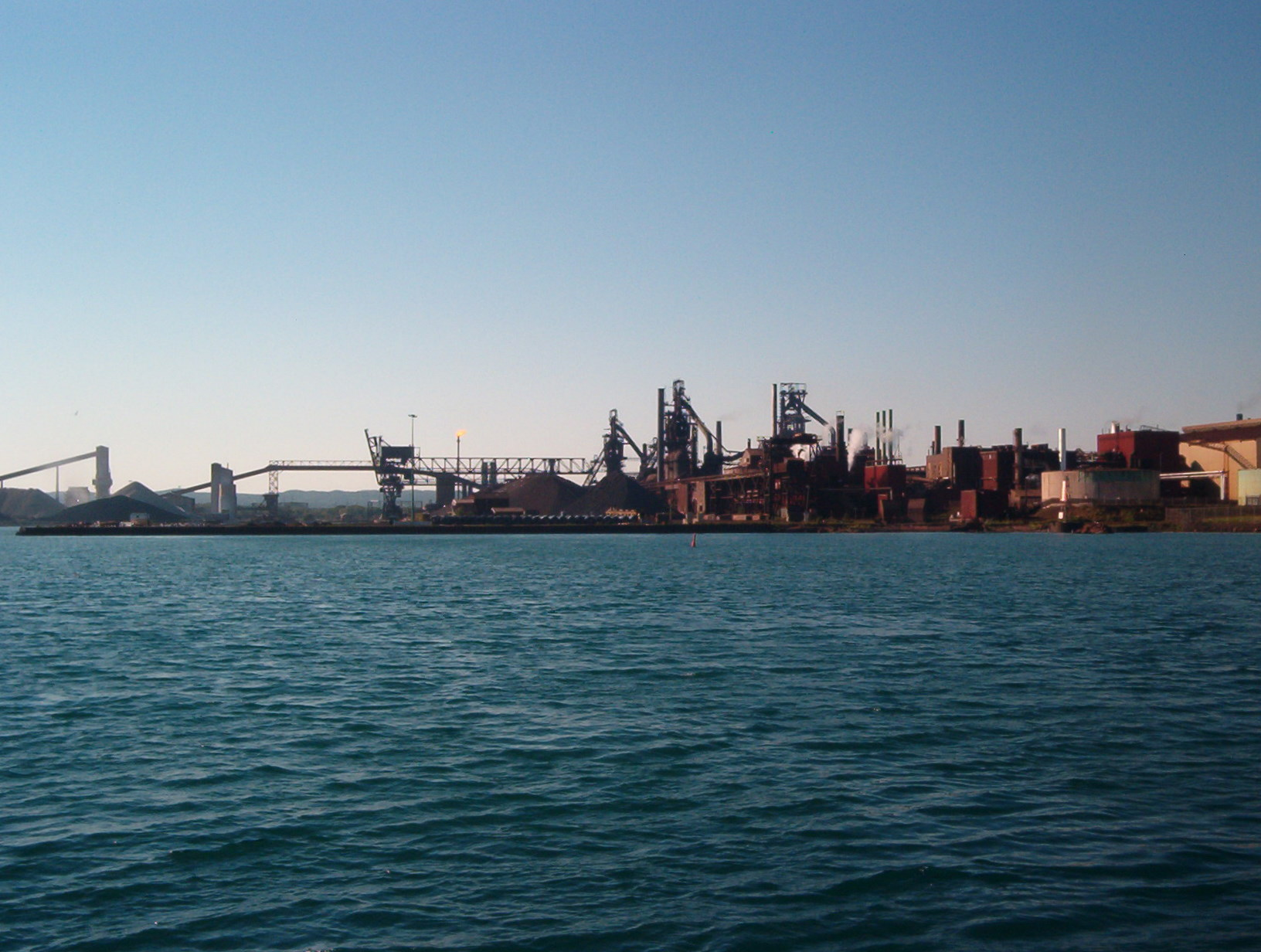
Essar Steel Algoma from North St. Mary's Island

Shortly after founding Algoma, Clergue's various financial operations suffered reverses, having to shutter operations in 1903, causing the 1903 Consolidated Lake Superior riot. After restructuring, he lost control of the Sault Ste. Marie complex, being replaced as general manager in 1903 and by 1908 Clergue was no longer on the company's board of directors. Initially, the company specialized in manufacture of rails for Canadian railways, but this soon became a dead-end as railway construction passed its peak.

During the First World War Algoma made steel for artillery shells but after the war continued to rely on rail production. The necessity of importing ore and coal from the United States due to the low quality of Canadian iron ore, as well as the absentee owners' greater interest in annual dividends than building a viable industrial complex, held back Algoma during the 1920s. At the height of the Great Depression, the company was insolvent and in receivership until financier Sir James Dunn, who had had a minority role in the mill's ownership since 1908, gained control in 1935 and restored it to profitability. Dunn's policy of never paying a dividend to stockholders, coupled with extensive modernization and expansion during the Second World War, and an extended period of steel demand up until the mid-1950s, allowed Algoma to expand and become a more balanced steel producer.

=== Dofasco takeover and 1990-92 bankruptcy ===
Algoma Steel was publicly traded on the Toronto Stock Exchange in the 1980s when Dofasco bought the company from then controlling shareholder Canadian Pacific Limited. Canadian Pacific Ltd. owned 53.8% and they agreed to a total purchase price of CAD $560 million. At the time of the transaction, it was reported that Algoma had 9,000, largely unionized, employees. Dofasco owned Algoma from 1988 to 1991, making the combined company the largest steel producer in Canada. However, Dofasco wrote-off their equity investment less than three years later as Algoma entered a prolonged restructuring process. A strike at Algoma both reduced cash flows and increased costs, contributing to the financial stress of the company.

The high exchange rate of the Canadian dollar coupled with competition from mini mills, lower-cost and currency-strong Asian countries and dumping by Japanese companies has hurt Canadian primary steel producers. In 2002, the company emerged from bankruptcy protection for the second time in a decade, having previously gone into bankruptcy in 1990. Denis Turcotte, the president and CEO, was largely credited with Algoma's resurgence, making it one of the most efficient steelmakers in North America.

Algoma Steel announced on August 3, 2005, that the company was no longer for sale after a $64.7 million second quarter profit. The company stated that they are going to focus on value-enhancing, non-sale alternatives. Algoma also announced a special dividend of $6.00 per share payable on August 31, 2005, to shareholders of record on August 17, 2005, and a normal course issuer bid for up to 3.3 million shares.

On February 8, 2006, Algoma Steel announced a $55 million profit for their fourth quarter ending December 31, 2005. As a result of this and redemption of their 11% notes on January 9, 2006 the company declared themselves debt free and had an operating surplus of over $400 million in cash. This cash surplus attracted the attention of some shareholders who wanted to see the cash distributed as dividends, echoing Algoma's historic problems almost exactly a century earlier.

=== Essar Global takeover and subsequent restructuring ===
On 15 April 2007, India's Essar Global made an offer to acquire Algoma Steel Inc. for $1.85 billion CAD in cash. It was announced on 20 June that Essar had completed its purchase of all outstanding shares.

On June 23, 2008, following its purchase by Essar Group, Algoma Steel Inc. announced that its name had been changed to Essar Steel Algoma Inc. This came along with a logo change to the Essar Steel company logo.

On May 26, 2017, Essar Steel Algoma was rebranded once again, simply called Algoma. The announcement was made in Sault Ste. Marie, Ontario. For legal purposes, the factory will remain "Essar Steel Algoma Inc." until the company emerges from insolvency protection.

In May 2021 Algoma had a yearly production capacity of 2.8 million tonnes of steel, for which it employed around 2,700 people.

== Production and energy supply ==
=== Steel making facilities ===
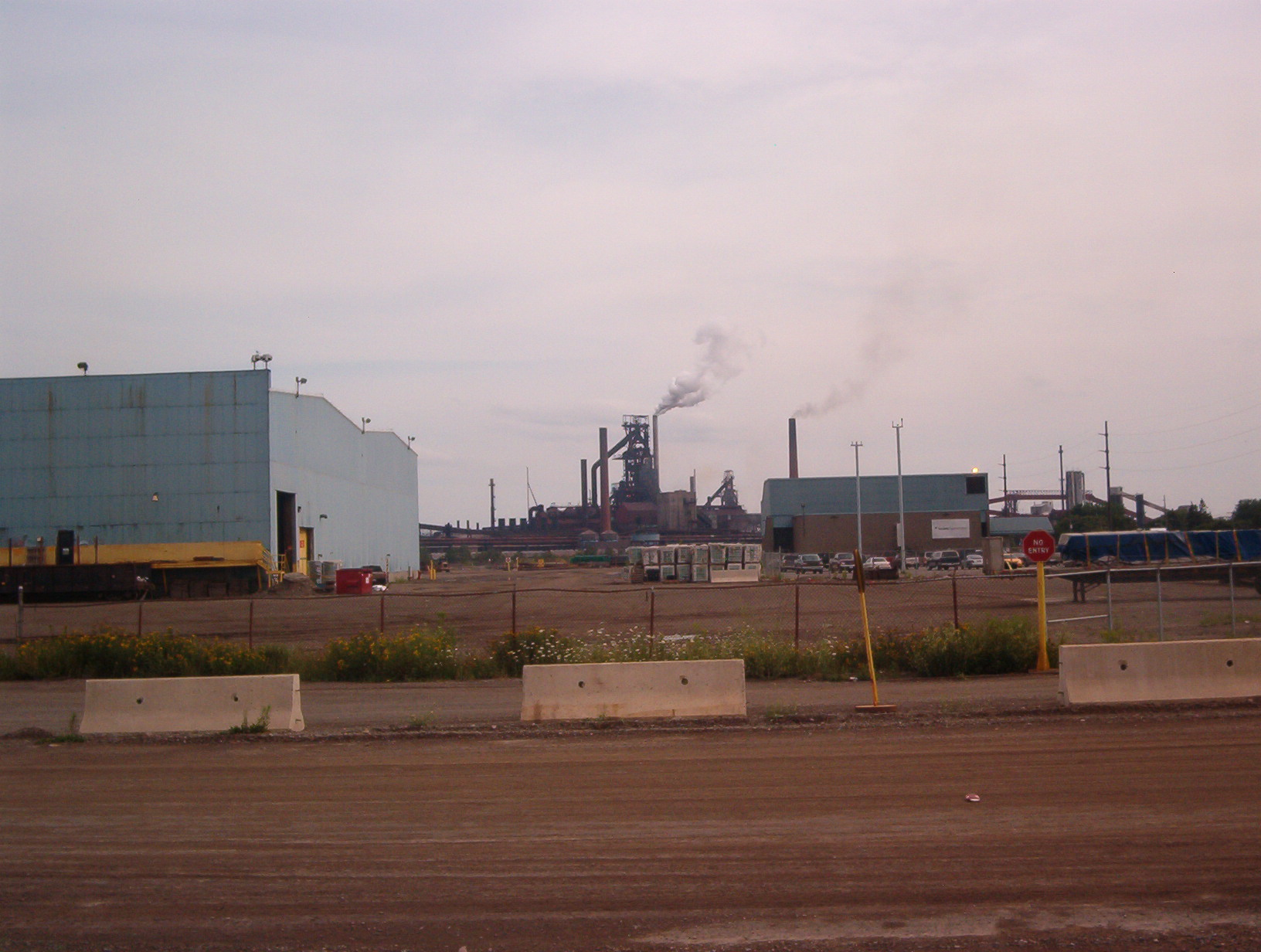
Essar Steel Algoma from Wallace Terr., Sault Ste. Marie

Algoma currently has a capacity of 4 million tons per year. Primary steel making facilities include two blast furnaces, three coke batteries, two 260 short ton basic oxygen furnaces, with two ladle metallurgy stations for refining and alloying. Having abandoned the manufacture of steel rails, Algoma employs a direct strip production complex manufactured by Danieli of Italy, which casts strip directly and then rolls it to finished strip in the range of 0.047 inches to 0.625 inches in thickness, and widths to 64 inches. Algoma also operates a hot strip mill, a plate mill, and a cold strip mill. Algoma also manufactures welded structural beams.

=== Power generation and supply ===
In October 2006, Algoma Steel was awarded a power purchase agreement by the Ontario Power Authority to build, own and operate a co-generation power plant utilizing by-product fuels such as blast furnace gas (BFG) and coke oven gas (COG); Algoma Steel has founded a limited partnership company called Algoma Energy LP to own and operate the co-generation facility. The facility's contract capacity was said to be 63MW.

On June 15, 2009, Essar Steel Algoma successfully started up a new, 85 MW cogeneration facility, to produce electricity and steam from the by-products of the coke making and iron making processes.

It features two 375,000 lb/hr boilers and a 105MW turbine combined with other related components such asite-specific, a blast furnace gas holder, condensate and feed-water systems, a water treatment plant, a cooling tower, a transformer, and a distributed control system. Essar has set a precedent as the first integrated steel manufacturer in Canada to construct a co-generation facility fueled with by-product gas from the operation.

== Criticism ==
=== Air Quality ===
Algoma has exceeded provincial air quality standards with permission from Ontario’s Ministry of the Environment, Conservation and Parks (MECP). In 2023, Algoma had three regulatory exemptions: two for carcinogenic air pollutants, benzene and benzo(a)pyrene, and another for particulate matter. These site-specific standards permit the company to exceed annual air quality limits.

== Current status ==
Algoma currently (2009?) is the second largest steel producer in Canada. It is the largest employer in Sault Ste. Marie and currently has 2800 employees at the main plant. Algoma now only produces hot rolled steel (i.e. sheet and plate).

Algoma's products are used in the automotive, construction, energy, manufacturing, pipe and tube, and steel distribution industries.

== Leadership ==
=== President ===
1. James Frater Taylor, 1909 – 31 December 1917
2. William Charles Franz, 1 January 1918 – 1935
3. Sir James Hamet Dunn, 8 May 1935 – 1 January 1956
4. David Stearns Holbrook, 28 May 1956 – 1976
5. Dr John Macnamara, 1976–1981
6. Peter Marlborough Nixon, 1981–1990
7. Robert Joseph Swenor, 1990–June 1991
8. Gary Lucenti, June 1991–31 December 1992
9. William Allan Hopkins, 1 January 1993–1996
10. Alexander Adam, 1996–31 August 2002
11. Denis Turcotte, 2002–2008
12. Armando Plastino, 2008–2010
13. James Hrusovsky, 2011–1 November 2012
14. Kalyan Ghosh, 1 November 2012–2019
15. Michael McQuade, 2019– 1 June 2022
16. Michael D. Garcia, 1 June 2022 –

=== Chairman of the Board ===
1. Sir James Hamet Dunn, 8 May 1935 – 1 January 1956
2. David Stearns Holbrook, 1962 – 31 July 1977
3. Walter George Ward, 1 August 1977 – 1981
4. Dr John Macnamara, 1981–1990
5. William Laurie Wallace, 1990–1991
6. Herbert Earl Joudrie, 1991–2002
7. Benjamin C. Duster, February 2002 – June 2006
