= The Evening News (Sault Ste. Marie) =

Newspaper in Michigan, US

- Type: Daily newspaper
- Format: Broadsheet
- Owner: USA Today Co.
- Publisher: None
- Managing editor: Brenda Weber-Rigotti
- Founded: 1901; 125 years ago, as Sault Ste. Marie Daily News
- Headquarters: 109 Arlington Street, Sault Ste. Marie, Michigan 49783, United States
- Circulation: 1,900
- Website: SooEveningNews.com

The Sault News is the main daily and newspaper of record of Sault Ste. Marie, Michigan, United States. It is owned by USA Today Co. Circulation is 1,900 in the Soo area, including Chippewa County, Michigan.

The paper was founded in 1901 as the Sault Ste. Marie Daily News, taking the names The Sault News-Record and The Daily News-Record later that year and eventually adopting the name The Evening News in 1903.

== See also ==
- Sault Star, the daily newspaper for Sault Ste. Marie, Ontario, Canada
