= Francis Clergue =

American businessman (1856–1939)

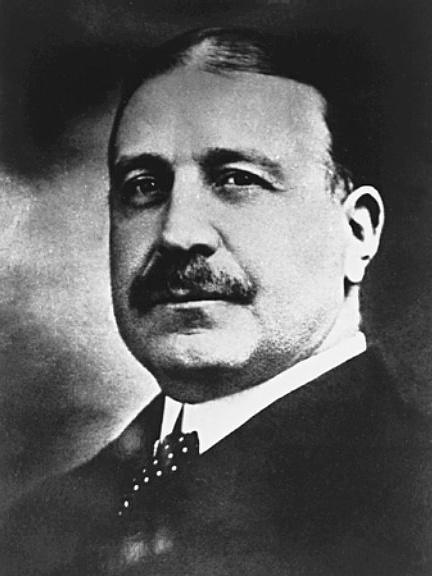
- Born: Francis Hector Clergue; August 28, 1856; Maine, United States
- Died: January 19, 1939 (aged 82); Montreal, Quebec, Canada
- Burial place: Mount Hope Cemetery, Bangor, Maine
- Education: University of Maine
- Occupation: Industrialist
- Known for: Founder of St. Mary's Paper, Algoma Steel, and the Algoma Central Railway

Francis Hector Clergue (August 28, 1856 – January 19, 1939) was an American businessman who became the leading industrialist of Sault Ste. Marie, Ontario, Canada, at the turn of the 20th century.

== Biography ==
=== Early life ===
Clergue was born on August 28, 1856, in the American state of Maine. The Canadian Encyclopedia lists his birthplace as Brewer, Maine, while the Dictionary of Canadian Biography and Who's Who in America instead list Brewer's sister city of Bangor. His father was Joseph Hector Clergue, a barber who was of French Huguenot origin. His mother, Frances Clarissa Lombard, was descended from 17th century American colonists who had originated in Kent, England; her father was a master shipbuilder.

He was born at a time when Maine reaped the economic benefits of timber and maritime economies. As a teenager, he delivered telegrams for the local railway stationmaster, exposing him to the rail transport industry. As a later businessman and industrialist, Clergue would repeatedly engage with these industries.

=== Ventures ===
Some aspects of Clergue's early life are uncertain, and he may have studied engineering at the Maine State College of Agriculture and the Mechanic Arts, or taught school. He eventually settled on a legal career, working at the law office of Frederick M. Laughton. He was called to the bar in 1878. He began to practice as a solicitor in Bangor under the partnership of Laughton and Clergue. The two lawyers became very active in promoting various business ventures, such as a silver mining scheme in nearby Hampden. His schemes grew increasingly grandiose, as he promoted a variety of ventures in regions as far away as Alabama and Persia, and the scope of industries ranged from tourism, railways, public utilities, and shipbuilding. This included civic improvement projects in Bangor such street lighting and a street railway, a power station on the Penobscot River, an iron mine in Digby, Nova Scotia, a pulp mill, a foghorn manufacturing company, and new rail lines extending from Bangor into rural Maine; these ventures met with varying success. To support them, Clergue created the Eastern Trust and Banking Company as a financing vehicle.

Clergue was remarked on for his skill as a speaker, who could draw in potential investors even as many of his ventures failed. The biographer Duncan McDowall remarks that "he possessed a knack for recognizing the potential of a new technology," but his ideas were often beyond practical possibility, and he lacked the technical knowledge and skills to implement them in realistic ways. Another biographer, Edward Allan Sullivan, described him as having "the courage of ignorance." He committed extensive resources into developing tourism infrastructure on Mount Desert Island in Penobscot Bay in the Gulf of Maine, which by the 1880s was becoming a wealthy tourist enclave. This consisted of a large hotel along with a mountainside cog railway, both of which opened in 1883 but proved to be financial failures. Before the end of the decade, Clergue had moved on to even greater peaks of ambition when at the suggestion of Maine politician James G. Blaine, he sought to compete with British and Russian interests in Persia. With the decline of Qajar Iran amidst the Great Game between these twin imperial powers, western financial and development interests began to encroach on the country. Clergue made a bid for the long-term monopoly on banking, water utilities, and railways in Iran, but failed and had to return home in defeat. Similarly, a scheme to draw British investment to shipbuilding in Mobile, Alabama, was also a failure.

As a businessman, Clergue's most notably developed concept was of industrial integration, a principle which he continually returned to and emphasized; he described it as "the principle of correlation". Clergue believed that a cluster of related enterprises could achieve economies of scale if integrated successfully. His charisma and vision proved influential with politicians and financiers who, at the peak of the Gilded Age, were willing to invest in ambitious projects. By the 1890s, Clergue was backed by significant Philadelphia and New York investment interests.

=== Arrival at Sault Ste. Marie ===
Canada was a logical investment choice for American finance capital, and Clergue soon arrived there to scout for opportunities. Clergue initially planned to travel to Fort William, which commanded a strong position at the head of Lake Superior, to investigate the possibility of hydroelectric development. Along the way, he took an interest in Sault Ste. Marie, which had water and rail transport connections, but had been bypassed by the Canadian Pacific Railway's transcontinental mainline a decade earlier, and whose economy had stagnated with the decline of the fur trade. Local businessmen had attempted a hydropower scheme intending to capitalize on the rapids of the St. Marys River, but a construction disaster left the project unfinished, with a debt load of $263,000 hanging over it. Clergue, who had arrived in 1894, sensed an opportunity and bought up the defunct power company, promising Sault Ste. Marie a large injection of American investment. The town council in return gave him an exclusive 20-year franchise on hydroelectric power generation, as well as a 10-year municipal tax exemption.

Clergue was experienced at dealing with politicians, and sensed provincial and federal policies in the north around the development of "New Ontario". Strategies like the National Policy championed by John A. Macdonald sought to grow Canada's manufacturing base and encourage immigration through exploitation of natural resources, and numerous financial incentives were available to industrialists and promoters who would contribute to an increase in settlement. Clergue later remarked in 1901 that, "Let the governments, by judicious general laws and by special grants of wild lands where justifiable, tempt the capitalist and the manufacturer to establish works for the utilization of these Canadian raw materials, and then they will have established an agency for immigration more efficacious than a legion of lecturers and a million maps."

=== Initial industrial expansion ===
Clergue soon expanded power generation at Sault Ste. Marie to a level where it could supply both municipal power and power for several industries, and used hydropower as the nexus of a whirlwind of industrialization. Only a year into his arrival, in 1895, the Sault Ste. Marie Pulp and Paper Company (later St. Mary's Paper) was established. Clergue's plan was to source the sulfurous acid needed for papermaking from Sudbury's nickel mining and smelting industry, but the dominant Canadian Copper Company declined any deal with him. Clergue soon set his sights on the steel industry, but first he needed a ready supply of iron. With the 1897 discovery of hematite ore near Wawa in the northern part of Algoma District, Clergue quickly bought the mining claim and opened the Helen Mine, which was named after one of his sisters. To service the mine, he incorporated the Algoma Central Railway, one of the companies which is most associated with his legacy. With the line under construction, ore was transported via steamship.

In the east, near Sudbury, he purchased two nickel mining properties in 1899, naming them the Gertrude and Elsie mines, after other sisters of his. Similarly to his plans with the Algoma Central in Northern Algoma, Clergue planned for a railway to service the mines, and bought a paper railway, the Manitoulin and North Shore Railway (M&NS), which had been chartered in 1888 to connect Manitoulin Island with the mainland. In an industrial synergy, Clergue planned for the mines to give him two resources he desired: sulfur for his pulp and paper operations and nickel for steel-making. Construction on the Manitoulin and North Shore Railway began almost immediately and, characteristic of Clergue, it was with an expanded charter which included an ambitious southern extension via railcar ferry across Lake Huron's Georgian Bay from Manitoulin to Tobermory, and from there down the Bruce Peninsula to Meaford, Wiarton, and Owen Sound.

In 1901, construction began on Clergue's steel mill at Sault Ste. Marie, which would ultimately become Algoma Steel. His railway and steel interests had the backing of several federal politicians, such the cabinet minister Joseph-Israël Tarte and senator Raoul Dandurand, and he was able to secure a lucrative contract with Andrew George Blair, the federal minister of railways and canals, to supply rails for the federally-owned Intercolonial Railway, as well as a mandate that all rails purchased for federally-subsidized railways be Canadian-made. Clergue also negotiated a contract to supply steel to Krupp, the German arms manufacturing conglomerate.

=== Turn of fortune ===
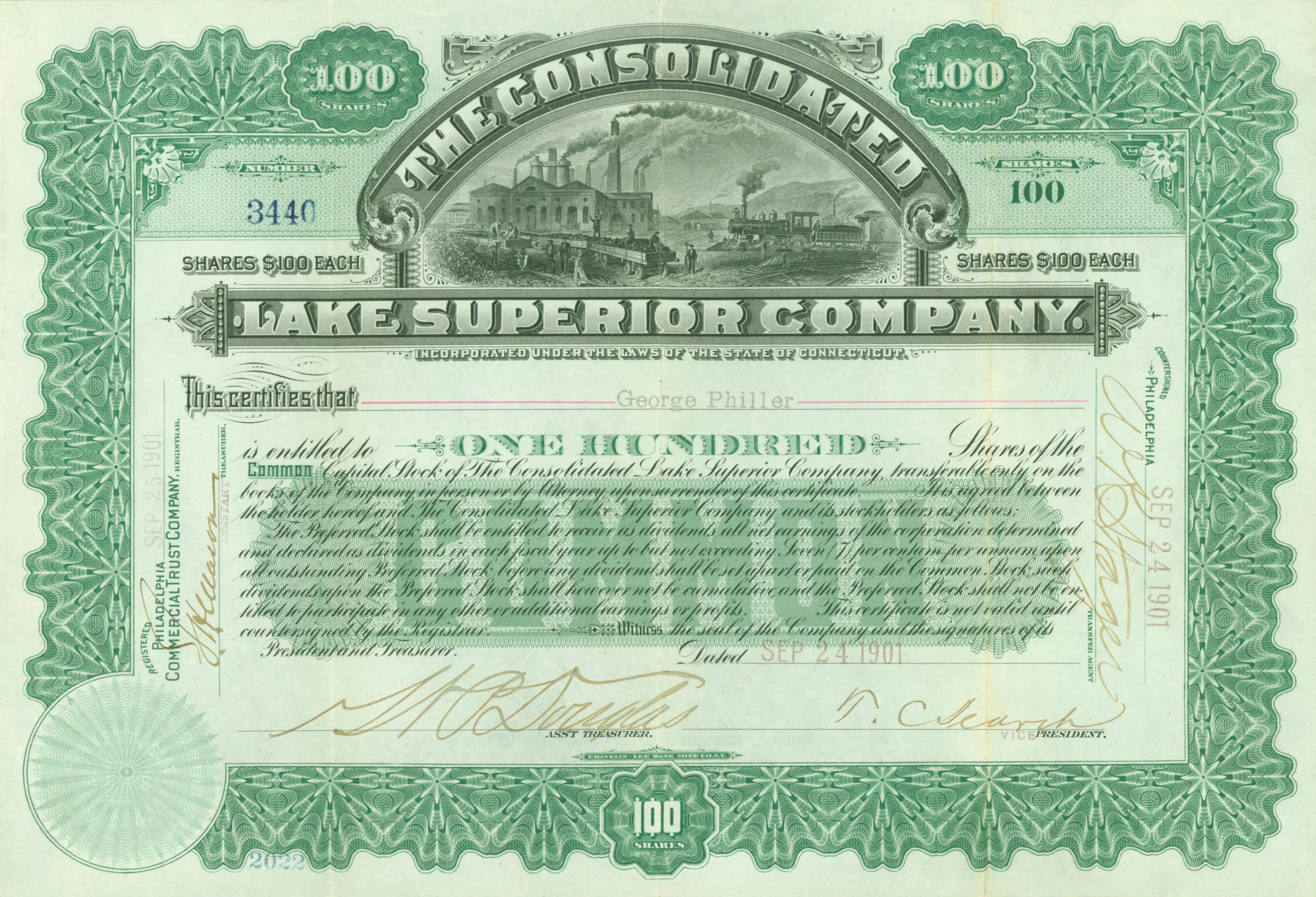
Common share of the Consolidated Lake Superior Company, issued 24. September 1901

Captain of a fast-growing industrial empire that now employed 7,000 people, Clergue was celebrated by boards of trade, politicians, and the media as having conquered the wilderness of Algoma, which until this point had been little impacted by European colonization. Implementing his theory of industrial integration, Clergue formed the Consolidated Lake Superior Company, which had a controlling stake in all of the industrial interests he had founded, with most of the remaining shares held by his Philadelphia and New York financial backers. It was initially valued at US$117 million.

Signs of underlying problems began to appear as some of Clergue's enterprises struggled to fully launch. His steel plant's Bessemer converters began to come online, but the blast furnaces necessary to produce pig iron for the converters were still incomplete. To Clergue's frustration, he was unable to manufacture steel at Sault Ste. Marie as an entirely internal process. By September 1903, the Algoma mill had produced only 1,243 tons of steel rails and was unable to service the loans it had taken out the previous year, a large part of the debt being owed to the Speyer financial interests of New York City. The company failed to meet its payroll obligations and the various Consolidated Lake Superior plants and mines were shut down. On September 28, the idled and unpaid workers rioted in the streets of Sault Ste. Marie, leading to the deployment of 350 militiamen, who were brought by train from Toronto.

The sudden collapse of the Consolidated Lake Superior Company created a panic amongst the provincial and federal governments. The government of Ontario guaranteed the workers' unpaid wages, while the Dominion government lobbied internationally in support of the company. Ontario premier George William Ross argued to the provincial legislature that the New Ontario project could not afford the loss of the Consolidated Lake Superior's industries, making the Consolidated too big to fail. Despite these efforts, the company was put into liquidation on December 14.

Clergue spent several months rebuilding the company, which was reborn as the Lake Superior Corporation in February 1904. The Lake Superior Corporation was considerably streamlined compared to its predecessor, and some operations were never to reopen, such as the Gertrude and Elsie mines near Sudbury. With Clergue's reputation in ruins, the new corporation instead had a Toronto promoter, Charles Douglas Warren, as its president, and a board of directors with three members chosen by the Ontario government, including the Toronto lawyer Newton Rowell. Within five years, Clergue was also removed from the board of directors, pushing him out of the organization entirely. The Lake Superior Corporation would go on to finish construction of the Manitoulin and North Shore Railway, which was renamed to the Algoma Eastern Railway, matching the naming scheme of other Lake Superior subsidiaries. Despite plans to extend the Algoma Eastern south across Lake Huron using a railcar ferry, as well as west to meet the Algoma Central, the line changed little until it was sold by the financially distressed Lake Superior Corporation to the Canadian Pacific Railway, which quickly abandoned much of the Algoma Eastern mainline that paralleled the CPR's own Algoma Branch. Continuing to struggle during the Great Depression, in 1935 the Lake Superior Corporation came under the control of another industrialist, James Hamet Dunn, who once again salvaged and streamlined its operations to centre around Algoma Steel, which had become its flagship enterprise.

=== Later years and death ===
Clergue continued his work as an industrial promoter until his death, largely in a freelance consulting capacity, and was Montreal-based for much of the rest of his life. He created a new firm, the Universal Engineering Corporation, to act as a vehicle for his schemes much as the Eastern Trust and Banking Company and the Consolidated Lake Superior Company had been. He also became president of the Waterbury Tool Company, which manufactured hydraulic equipment. His interest continued both in transportation projects and in the potential development of the area around Hudson Bay, where the Algoma Central had once been intended to stretch to. He advocated for another east–west transcontinental railway (the "North Railway") which would connect Montreal to James Bay and continue onward through the far north along the 60th parallel. Clergue was also an early lobbyist in the 1920s for the enlarging of the St. Lawrence navigational corridor, which would eventually proceed in the 1950s as the Saint Lawrence Seaway project, though he would not live to see it.

During the First World War, he joined the board of Canadian Car and Foundry, where he worked to sell munitions to the Russian Empire. Finally, near the very end of his life, he attempted to sell Canadian railway equipment to Manchukuo following the Japanese invasion of Manchuria in the 1930s.

Clergue died on January 19, 1939, in Montreal, and his remains were returned to the United States for burial at Mount Hope Cemetery in Bangor.

== Legacy ==
Popular Canadian author Alan Sullivan's novel The Rapids (1920) is inspired by Clergue's life. In 1946, Sir James Dunn, the then owner of Algoma Steel, commissioned Sullivan to write Clergue's biography. Provisionally titled Before the Tide, it has never been published.

Despite Clergue's dogged efforts to pursue integration of his various enterprises, they were ultimately broken apart piecemeal. While some, like the Gertrude and Elsie mines, did not survive the initial failure of the Consolidated Lake Superior Company at all, others survived in various forms even as the Lake Superior Corporation was unable to maintain its control of them. Clergue's pulp and paper mill was eventually acquired by the Abitibi Power and Paper Company in 1928, then by a succession of owners until its eventual closure in 2011. The Algoma Eastern Railway's 1930 lease to the Canadian Pacific Railway proceeded despite the Algoma Eastern earning a net profit in 1929, as the cash infusion from the lease was necessary to keep the Lake Superior Corporation afloat. The Algoma Central Railway evolved into the Algoma Central Corporation, and diversified into other transportation interests such as trucking and maritime shipping, as well as real estate. Algoma Steel and its related mining interests in Northern Algoma remained one of the most recognizable parts of the Lake Superior Corporation's organizational system through the rest of the 20th century, and was eventually acquired by Dofasco in 1988.

Clergue had lasting popularity in Sault Ste. Marie, and in 1937 a portrait of him was placed in its city hall. Things in the city named after him include:

- Clergue Park - a small city park
- Clergue Street - short residential street
- French immersion school (F.H. Clergue Public School)

Clergue was inducted into Sault Ste. Marie's Walk of Fame in 2006.
