= Gandi Sulistiyanto =

Indonesian diplomat (born 1960)

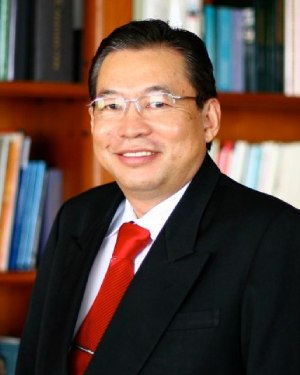

Member of Indonesia's Presidential Advisory Board
- In office 17 July 2023 – 20 October 2024 Serving with List: Sidarto Danusubroto; Agung Laksono; Muhammad Luthfi bin Yahya; Putri Kuswisnu Wardani; Soekarwo; Djan Faridz
- President: Joko Widodo
- Preceded by: Arifin Panigoro

Indonesia Ambassador to South Korea
- In office 2021–2023
- President: Joko Widodo
- Preceded by: Umar Hadi
- Succeeded by: Cecep Herawan

Personal details
- Born: February 13, 1960 (age 66) Pekalongan, Central Java, Indonesia
- Spouse: Susi Ardhani
- Children: 3
- Education: Diponegoro University (Indonesia)
- Occupation: Diplomat and Businessman

Gandi Sulistiyanto Soeherman (born February 13, 1960) is a businessperson, an Indonesian diplomat, and former Managing Director of Sinar Mas Group. He served as the Indonesian Ambassador to South Korea from 2021 to 2023.

== Early life and education ==
Sulistiyanto was born in Pekalongan, Central Java. He is the eldest of six children from a farming family. He received an undergraduate degree from Diponegoro University, Semarang.

Sulistiyanto was raised by his grandparents and went through high school and college while working to pay for his younger siblings' education. He began his career after studying at Diponegoro University and also met his wife, Susi Ardhani, at the university.

== Career ==
Sulistiyanto worked at Astra International for 10 years after graduating. After working at Astra, he created Sinar Mas by joining one of its companies, PT Asuransi Jiwa Eka Life (now known as Sinar Mas MSIG Life) in 1992.

In 2001, he became the Managing Director of Sinar Mas, and lead the Sinar Mas Debt Restructuring Task Force Team, which at that time amounted to USD13.5 billion.

He has served as Managing Director of Sinar Mas from 2001.

== Indonesian Ambassador to South Korea ==
In June 2021, President Joko Widodo nominated Gandi Sulistiyanto for Indonesian Ambassador to South Korea.

Sulis was sworn in as Ambassador to South Korea on November 17, 2021 at Istana Negara, and began in December 2021.

== See also ==
- Asia Pulp & Paper
- Eka Tjipta Foundation
- Smartfren Telecom
- Berau Coal
- Bumi Serpong Damai
- Tjiwi Kimia
- Sinar Mas Multiartha
