= 2015 Southeast Asian haze =

Smoke haze over the Southeast Asia region

- Part of Southeast Asian haze
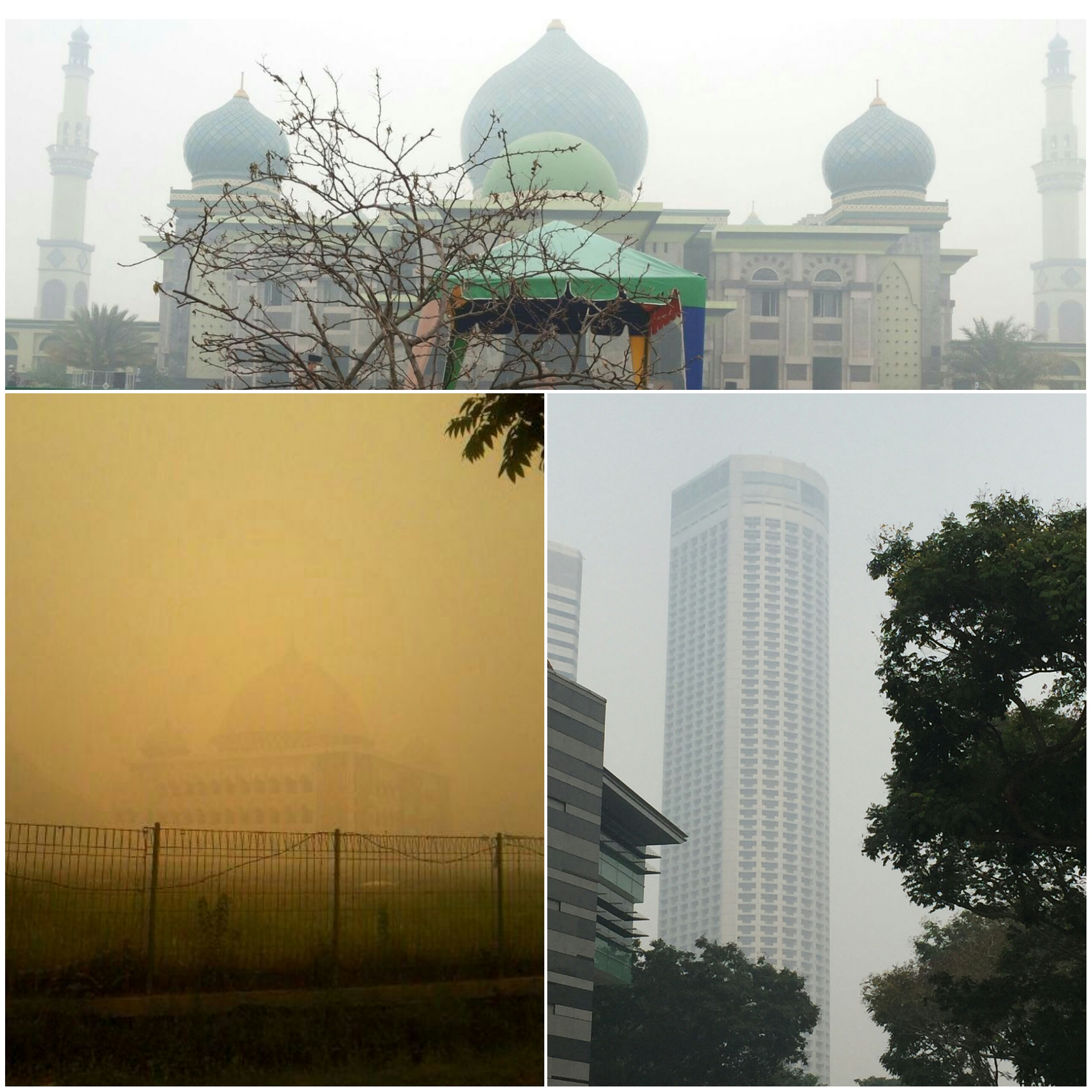
- A collage showing various landmarks in the haze. Top: An-Nur Great Mosque, Pekanbaru, Indonesia; Bottom-left: Darussalam Grand Mosque Palangkaraya, Indonesia; Bottom-right: Swissôtel The Stamford, Singapore
- Duration: 28 June 2015 – 29 October 2015
- Location: Brunei Cambodia (suspected) Indonesia (origin) Malaysia Philippines Singapore Thailand Vietnam
- Outcome: State of emergency declared in six Indonesian provinces School closures in Indonesia, Malaysia and Singapore; Swimming World Cup disrupted Kuala Lumpur Marathon cancelled Sultan of Selangor's Cup cancelled
- Deaths: Indonesia: 19 died due to respiratory infections. 10 people killed due to smog from forest and land fires Dozens reported dead in road accidents due to poor visibility.
- Injuries: Indonesia: 503,874 (by 23 October 2015)
- Property damage: $35-47 billion (2015 USD)

The 2015 Southeast Asian haze was an air pollution crisis affecting several countries in Southeast Asia, including Brunei, Indonesia (especially its islands of Sumatra and Borneo), Malaysia, Singapore, southern Thailand, Vietnam, Cambodia and the Philippines.

The haze affected Indonesia from at least late June, to the end of October, turning into an international problem for other countries in September. It was the latest occurrence of the Southeast Asian haze, a long-term issue that occurs in varying intensity during every dry season in the region. It was caused by forest fires resulting from slash-and-burn practices, principally on the Indonesian islands of Sumatra and Kalimantan, which then spread quickly in the dry season.

On 4 September 2015, the Indonesian National Board for Disaster Management stated that six Indonesian provinces had declared a state of emergency due to the haze; these were Riau, Jambi, South Sumatra, West Kalimantan, Central Kalimantan and South Kalimantan. On 14 September, a state of emergency was again declared in Riau, this time by the Indonesian government. Thousands of residents of Pekanbaru, Riau's capital, fled to the nearby cities of Medan and Padang. On 24 October, the Pollutant Standards Index (PSI) hit a record high of 1801, recorded in the province of Central Kalimantan.

More than 28 million people in Indonesia alone were affected by the crisis, and more than 140,000 reported respiratory illness. According to a 2016 Harvard-Columbia University study, the haze caused more than 100,000 additional deaths, most of them (> 90,000) in Indonesia. But later, the claim was refuted by Indonesia, Singapore and Malaysian health authorities. The haze caused by the Indonesian forest fires has been shown to increase haze-related illnesses, such as upper respiratory illnesses and acute conjunctivitis, in Singapore.

The Indonesian government estimated that the haze crisis would cost it between 300 and 475 trillion rupiah (up to US$35 billion or S$47 billion) to mitigate. School closures due to the haze were implemented in Indonesia, Malaysia and Singapore; these affected nearly four million students in Malaysia alone. Among the events disrupted or even cancelled due to the haze were the 2015 FINA Swimming World Cup in Singapore and the Kuala Lumpur Marathon in Malaysia.

Heavy rains in Sumatra and Kalimantan in the last days of October 2015 significantly reduced the size and number of fires, and improved the air quality in most affected areas. In turn, the NEA of Singapore stopped issuing haze advisories from 15 November 2015.

== Background ==
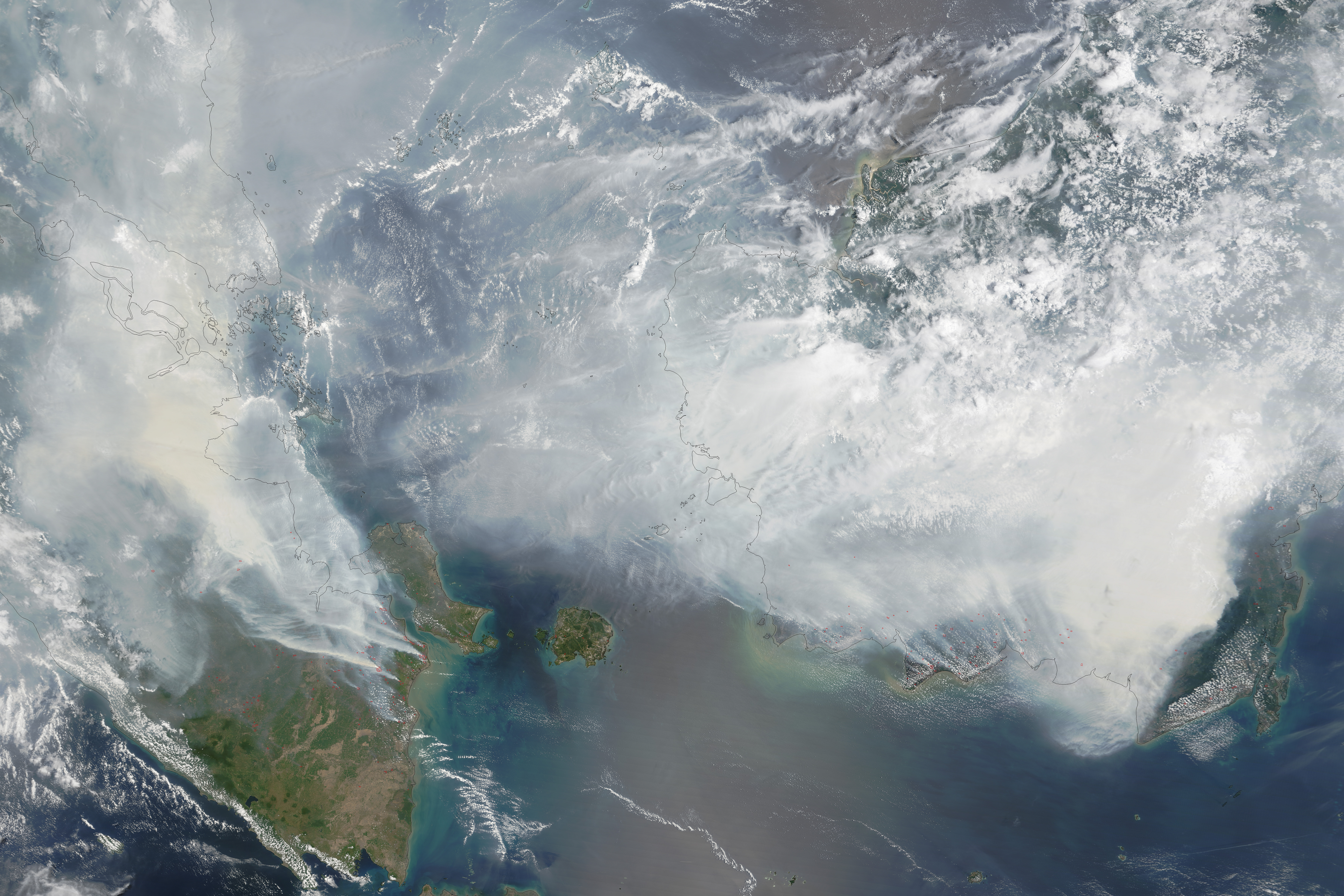
A NASA satellite image showing the extent of the haze on 24 September 2015.

Indonesia has struggled for years to contain forest fires, especially on the islands of Sumatra and Borneo. In September 2014, Indonesia ratified the ASEAN Agreement on Transboundary Haze Pollution. It is the last ASEAN country to do so. The agreement calls on Indonesia to take steps to solve the problem through its own efforts or through international co-operation, or else face legal action based on the impact of the haze on its south-east Asian neighbours. In 2014, Singapore also passed laws that allow it to prosecute people and firms that contribute to the haze. In early August 2015, although Cambodia, Laos, Thailand, Myanmar, and Vietnam met to discuss the haze problem, Indonesia did not join the talks.

=== Causes ===
The fires are caused by firms and farmers using slash-and-burn practices as a inexpensive means to clear their land of unwanted vegetation. Sumatra and Kalimantan possess large areas of peatland, which is highly combustible during dry season. Peat, which is made up of layers of dead vegetation and other organic matter, contributed heavily to carbon emissions because of the substance's high density and carbon content. The haze was particularly severe in 2015 due to the El Niño phenomenon, which caused drier conditions, causing the fires to spread more.

Research published in the Environmental Research Letters stated that 59% of fire emissions in Sumatra and 73% in Kalimantan originated from "outside timber and palm oil concession boundaries". Environmental rights activists added that palm oil activities were still involved in the burning. Firstly, land clearing by burning is cheap and is more often chosen by companies than any other land-clearing method. Secondly, most companies want to avoid spending money on reforestation. Any company which obtains a license for forest lands must replant them from a fund provided by the government. Most companies do not replant, and to avoid detection, they burn the land. Thirdly, the companies revitalise palm plantations by cutting or burning old palm trees that are no longer productive. The regulation stipulates that such burning must be done on a bed of concrete to avoid spreading the fire, but to reduce costs, most companies do not do this.

== Countries affected ==
At least six of the ten countries in the ASEAN region have been affected by the haze: southern Thailand, Vietnam, and most parts of Brunei, Indonesia, Malaysia, and Singapore. The haze affecting Cambodia and Cebu in the Philippines was also suspected to have arisen from Indonesian rather than local sources.

On 29 September 2015, the IBTimes published interactive before-and-after photos that showed the dramatically reduced visibility in Singapore and Indonesia due to haze.

The Global Fire Emissions Database reported that the 2015 Indonesian fires had generated around 600 million tonnes of greenhouse gases, an amount described as 'roughly equivalent to Germany's entire annual output'. NASA said that the 2015 haze crisis could become the worst one recorded in the region, possibly outstripping the 1997 crisis, which cost an estimated nine billion US dollars.

=== Brunei ===
Smoke from forest fires in Kalimantan, blown by prevailing south-westerly winds, brought hazy conditions to Brunei. A duty forecaster at the Brunei Meteorological Department, Nurulinani Haji Jahari, said that heavy thunderstorms would do little to relieve the hazy conditions because westerly winds were still expected to continue bringing more smoke from Kalimantan and Sumatra. On 15 September, the Tutong District recorded an all-time-high Pollutant Standards Index (PSI) reading of 68; followed by Belait, with 67; Brunei-Muara, with 65; and Temburong, with 48. The Bruneian public were advised by authorities to drink plenty of water and seek medical assistance if experiencing smoke-related symptoms. Authorities also warned against any open burning or other activities that might worsen the haze.

=== Cambodia ===
Phnom Penh suffered from haze, and its Cambodian Ministry of the Environment suspected that fires set by plantation owners in Indonesia might be to blame. Uncertainty of the source remained since Indonesia released little relevant information.

=== Indonesia ===
The 2015 haze affected Indonesia from at least late June, with the municipality of Dumai (in the province of Riau on the island of Sumatra) reporting haze beginning 28 June. The problem persisted for months.

As of 7 October 2015, more than 140,000 Indonesians had reported respiratory illnesses in the haze-affected areas. By 15 September 2015, around 25,834 were suffering from respiratory infection, 538 having pneumonia, 2,246 suffering from skin irritation, and 1,656 suffering from eye irritation. The haze blanketing the whole of Sumatra island and parts of Kalimantan hampered tourism, aviation and maritime activities as well as the Indonesian economy. A state of emergency was declared in the province of Riau, one of the worst-affected by the haze. In Riau's capital, Pekanbaru, authorities ordered the closing of schools to prevent pupils from being exposed to the haze, and thousands were forced to flee the city. Flight cancellations were reported daily in Pekanbaru as well as in Balikpapan, East Kalimantan, due to poor visibility.

The Indonesian Agency for Meteorology, Climatology and Geophysics, which considers a pollution index over 350 "hazardous", reported on 22 September 2015 that the index in Palangkaraya in Central Kalimantan hit 1,986 and the index for Pontianak in West Kalimantan reached 706. These readings surpassed quintuple and double the official "hazardous" level, respectively. In late September, the province of Central Kalimantan measured a record high of 2,300 on Indonesia's PSI. On 2 October, Central Kalimantan was still experiencing a very high PSI of 1,801, such that firefighting helicopters were unable to water-bomb certain areas due to low visibility.

By mid-late October the burning hotspots, increasing sharply in number, had even spread to Indonesia's Papua region. The Terra Aqua satellite also discovered 63 hotspots in Maluku and 17 in North Maluku. 1,545 hotspots were detected in Indonesia, although the exact number couldn't be ascertained as the haze covering the region was too thick. The Nusa Tenggara Islands also had hotspots: around 67 in East Nusa Tenggara and 25 in West Nusa Tenggara. Dozens of flights were cancelled in Timika, West Papua. Both the Moluccas Islands and Sulawesi were covered by haze. In Sulawesi, around 800 hotspots were discovered by BPBD, a disaster mitigation agency. There were 57 hotspots in West Sulawesi, 151 in South Sulawesi, 361 in Central Sulawesi, 126 in Southeast Sulawesi, 47 in Gorontalo and 59 in North Sulawesi. The city of Palu was covered by haze from nearby Kalimantan, causing some flight delays.

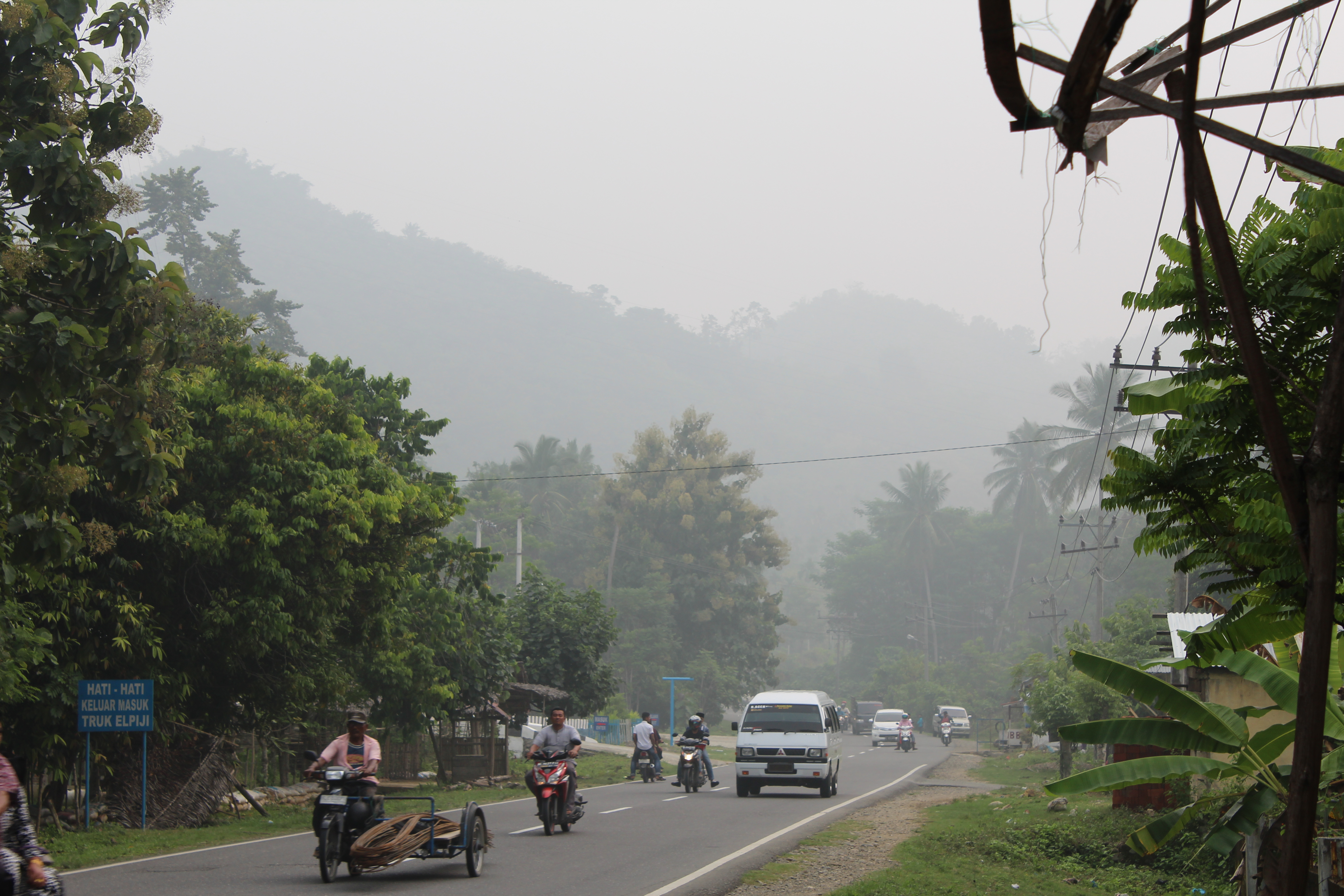
Limited visibility due to smog in Aceh, Sumatra, 24 October 2015

In Java, forest fires burned in West Java and Mount Merapi, Central Java. A forest fire, which trapped hikers and killed at least seven of them on Mount Lawu in Magetan Regency in East Java, was later reported to have been caused by a bonfire. This incident caused local areas to be evacuated. The haze in Palangkaraya was so thick that it turned the air yellow and exceeded the 'dangerous' threshold by 10 times. The annual parliamentary meeting was interrupted, as the smoke from outside entered the room, causing all of the politicians to use masks and tissues in the room. Most schools in the affected area were closed until further notice due to the haze. In Riau and Palembang, students were advised to go to school only twice a week. Sometimes they did not even go to school for a whole week due to the haze, causing wide concern among parents and government officials. At least ten companies, seven of which are foreign companies, were declared as the prime suspects for fire in Sumatra and Kalimantan. Two of the companies' certificates were suspended by the government. Indonesian president Joko Widodo ordered all hospitals and puskesmas (community health clinics) to be open for 24 hours. On 20 October, there were 825 new hotspots in Sumatra, with the visibility in Riau deteriorating to 50 meters. Around 66 flights in Pekanbaru were cancelled. At noon, the haze worsened as the air became yellow. The Government of Riau, later made a statement that the haze crisis has killed their citizens slowly by suffocating them.

On 21 October, it was reported that the number of people with respiratory problems had risen to 78,829 in Riau alone. Many reported they suffered from dizziness and sore eyes. Most of the victims killed by the haze were students and newborn babies. A nine-year-old third-grade student died because of the smoke and the doctors and nurses who tried to save the child reported that the child's lungs were fully filled with smoke. A 15-month-old baby also died in Jambi. The photos of the dead body, taken with the baby's mother, went viral on Facebook. The haze crisis also interrupted the search for a missing Eurocopter EC130 with five people on board in Lake Toba. The sole survivor reported that the cause of the crash was the haze.

=== Malaysia ===
Unhealthy Air Pollution Index (API) readings were recorded in 24 areas in the states of Sarawak, with Selangor and Langkawi in Kedah being the worst hit by the haze. Residents with asthma and pulmonary problems were told to stay indoors until the air quality in their areas improved. Malaysia's aviation and maritime sectors were put on high alert following a worsening in view of the reduced visibility caused by the haze. The education ministry stated all schools had to close if the API readings surpassed 200. As a result, on 15 September, schools in the four states of Sarawak, Selangor, Negeri Sembilan and Malacca together with the Federal Territories of Kuala Lumpur and Putrajaya were ordered to close temporarily. On 3 October, the officials decided to cancel the Standard Chartered KL Marathon 2015 due to the worsening haze. On 4 October, as haze reached unhealthy levels in many parts of the country, the government announced that all states except for Kelantan, Sabah and Sarawak were to close schools again for two days. The API in Shah Alam, Selangor even hit the hazardous level of 308. Until 20 October, around 1,909,842 students from 3,029 schools in Malaysia were affected, which increased to 2,696,110 students and 4,778 schools by 22 October. Flights were also delayed and cancelled in the east coast of Sabah due to continuous haze from Kalimantan. It was a concern in the week leading up to the 2015 Malaysian motorcycle Grand Prix as the event could have come under threat of haze.

=== Philippines ===
As of 3 October, the Philippine island of Cebu suffered its seventh straight day of haze. Therefore, it was suspected, although not confirmed, that the haze was originating from Indonesian and not local sources, possibly as a result of monsoon winds blowing north-east from fires in Indonesia towards the direction of the central Philippines. As a result, some Philippine aircraft had difficulties landing at Mactan–Cebu International Airport. Visual Flight Rules in the country were suspended, so that "only airline operations using airplanes with instrument flying capabilities are allowed to take off and land". The Philippines at first did not believe haze from Indonesia was reaching the country, but later suspected it was due to the fact that the haze did not disappear within a day as per the usual haze that is particular to the region of Cebu City. Gerry Bagtasa, an atmospheric scientist, however concluded that the haze in Cebu was both from Indonesian and local sources due to several factors including effects by Typhoon Koppu, locally known as Typhoon Lando, and the north-east monsoon. The interaction made a pocket of air above Cebu where a visible haze accumulated. Bagtasa said that the haze had already reached the island of Mindanao and other parts of Visayas when it was reported in Cebu but was too thin to be visible.

By mid-October, haze from Indonesia had reached Mindanao. On 20 October, it was reported that the Philippine Atmospheric, Geophysical and Astronomical Services Administration (PAGASA) in Southern Mindanao had been monitoring the haze for days. The weather body said that haze had been visible in Davao City since 17 October. Typhoon Koppu and the north-east monsoon were linked to the haze affecting Mindanao. Haze was also reported in the cities of Cagayan de Oro, General Santos, Iligan, Davao, and Zamboanga.

Haze affected operations of airports in Mindanao and Visayas. It was also observed in Metro Manila since 23 October although as of 25 October it was not linked to sources from Indonesia but to local pollution. At 12:00 (GMT+8) on 25 October, the research monitoring station in University of the Philippines Diliman recorded a PM2.5 measurement of above 150 micrograms, which is deemed as "hazardous". There were concerns about haze from Indonesia reaching Metro Manila and it was theorised that this could happen if another typhoon hit the country.

=== Singapore ===
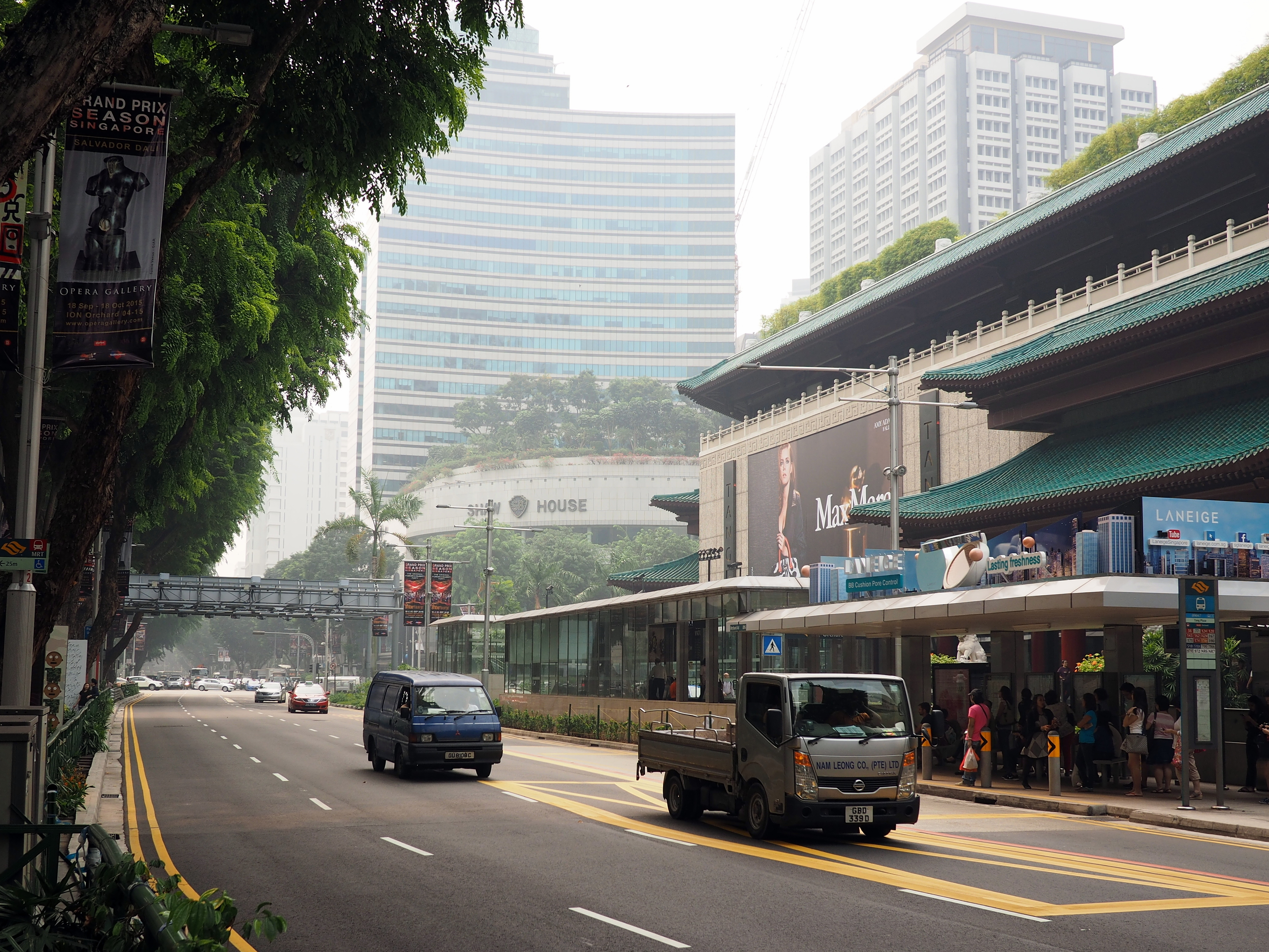
Hazy conditions in Orchard, Singapore during early September 2015

Some outdoor activities in Singapore were postponed following the haze. It was a concern in the week leading up to the 2015 Singapore Grand Prix as the event could have come under threat of haze. The haze rose into the "very unhealthy" range of the Pollutant Standards Index on 14 September, with a reading of 223 at 8 p.m. It rose further to 249 at 9 p.m. before dropping back to the "unhealthy" range for the rest of the night. Thunderstorms and rain had improved the situation in the afternoons of the 15th and 16th, while a change in prevailing wind direction improved the situation from the 20th to the 22nd.

The haze deteriorated again on the evening of the 23rd and the morning of the 24th as denser haze from Sumatra was blown into the country by prevailing southerly winds. On 24 September, the PSI reading at 7 p.m. rose into the "hazardous" range for the first time in 2015 with a reading of 313. It rose further to 317 at 8 p.m., which prompted the Ministry of Education (MOE) to close all primary and secondary schools on the 25th due to the worsening haze conditions. The haze deteriorated further during the small hours, reaching a record high for the year at 5 a.m. with a reading of 341. However, the 3-hour PSI quickly fell back into the "moderate" range at 1 p.m. the next day. The PSI had been hovering at the unhealthy range from the late afternoon to the evening, and the MOE announced schools to reopen on 28 September 2015. Since that day, PSI levels have remained at the unhealthy range, even rising up to very unhealthy on a few occasions.

On 24 September 2015, Ministry of Manpower (MOM) lodged a police report over a hoax post on social media (WhatsApp and Facebook) that claimed it had declared a "voluntary non-work day" on Friday, 25 September 2015 as a result of the haze.

On 25 September 2015, the government, for the first time, named five firms: Asia Pulp and Paper, Rimba Hutani Mas, Sebangun Bumi Andalas Wood Industries, Bumi Sriwijaya Sentosa and Wachyuni Mandira as responsible for the haze and instructed them to take measures to extinguish fires on their land, not to start new ones, and to submit action plans on how they would prevent future fires. The Minister for the Environment and Water Resources stressed that the haze was a man-made problem that should not be tolerated. Under Singapore's Transboundary Haze Pollution Act, those guilty can be fined up to $100,000 a day, capped at $2 million, for causing unhealthy haze.

Some of the 2015 FINA Swimming World Cup's events on 3 October 2015 were cancelled as the PSI was in the 'unhealthy' range.

On 19 October 2015, the 1-hour PM2.5 concentration reached a record high of 471μg/m^{3} for the West region at 11 p.m., while the South region was at 301μg/m^{3} . This was a sharp increase as the highest 1-hour PM2.5 concentration in Singapore at 9 p.m. was 164μg/m^{3} . The National Environment Agency attributed this to "denser haze from the sea areas south of Singapore being blown in by the prevailing south-south=easterly winds". Thunderstorms in the morning of 28 October 2015 brought respite from the haze when the PSI dropped from 61 to 26 at 9 a.m.

The National Environment Agency (NEA) announced that they would stop issuing daily haze advisories from 15 November 2015 onwards.

The 2015 haze crisis in Singapore was considered as the most serious haze episode for Singapore as it lasted for a long time. It was also the first time the Singapore Armed Forces (SAF) deployed a Republic of Singapore Air Force (RSAF) Chinook helicopter and 34 SAF personnel to help fight the ongoing forest fires in Sumatra, Indonesia.

=== Thailand ===
The haze from Sumatra turned most parts of southern Thailand such as Narathiwat, Pattani, Phuket, Satun, Songkhla, Surat Thani, Trang and Yala provinces unsightly, even reaching hazardous levels on 7 October The Phuket Provincial Health Office (PPHO) issued a health advisory to its residents in August 2015 and in October the province saw a number of flight delays in Phuket Airport. The air quality index in provinces of southern Thailand were increasing with the Regional Environmental Office Director Halem Jehmarikan saying the current air pollution levels were the result of the wind direction and a low pressure area, preventing the haze from being blown away. A number of hospitals saw an increase in child patients with respiratory system related symptoms. Halem also added the pollution was the worst in decades compared to previous smog that faded within four hours.

=== Vietnam ===
Ho Chi Minh City and other provinces in Southern Vietnam were enveloped in haze as of 4 October. Vietnamese experts believe that the phenomenon was partly caused by the fire in Indonesia. According to the southern unit of the Vietnamese National Centre for Hydro-Meteorological Forecasting, many provinces and cities in the Mekong Delta, such as Sóc Trăng, Cà Mau, Kiến Giang, Đồng Tháp, Bến Tre, and Cần Thơ also experienced similar foggy weather since the beginning of October. Residents were told to stay indoors as southern Vietnam saw a rising number of child patients suffering irritated eyes, nosebleeds, runny noses, and sneezing. The haze was predicted to continue for three days before being gradually eased by heavy rains.

== Counter-measures ==
=== Firefighting ===
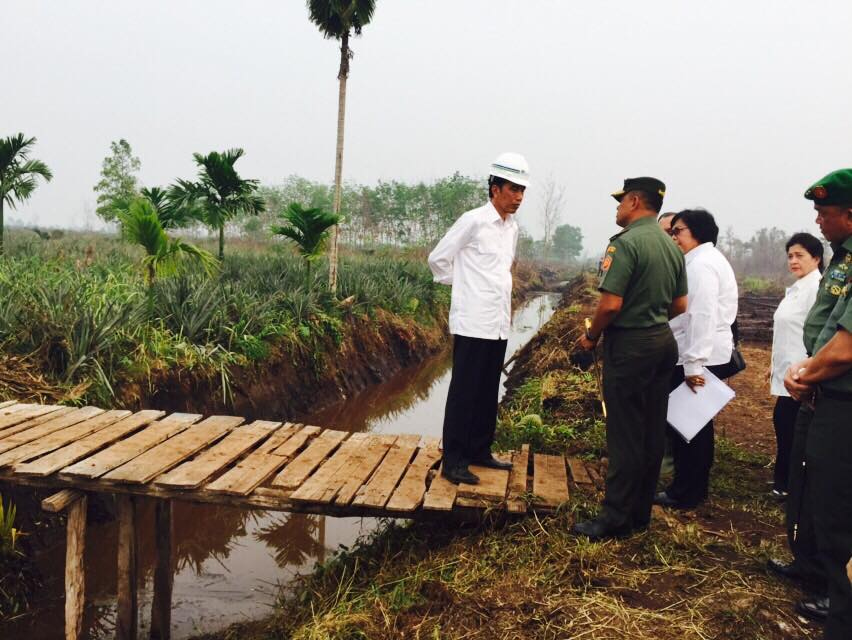
President Joko Widodo of Indonesia, inspecting the work in building retention basin to restore peatland moisture and to stop the forest fire in Rimbo Panjang, Riau.

Both Indonesia and Malaysia started daily cloud seeding on 15 September. Fourteen helicopters were deployed by Indonesian authorities to dump water on fires in Sumatra and Kalimantan, and cloud seeding aircraft were deployed to Kalimantan. In Malaysia, the cloud seeding operation was carried out for 10 days until 25 September in areas such as Kuching, Sri Aman, Kota Samarahan and Sarikei in Malaysian Borneo and Klang Valley in peninsular Malaysia.

The Indonesian government also started building retention basins to restore moisture to the peatland in Sumatra and Kalimantan. Dry peatland, due to the dry season and also drainage for oil palm cultivation, was cited as the reason that fire spread quickly. Retention basins were built by blocking water flow in drainage canals, and the re-wetted peatland would serve to check the fire.

Firefighting efforts involved Singapore, Malaysia and Australia. Russian-made Beriev Be-200 water bombers were involved. One of them had arrived at 21 Oct 0411 hours.

=== Mitigation of health effects ===
Free face masks were distributed to residents in areas worst affected by the haze and many schools in Peninsular Malaysia, Sarawak, Singapore as well as Indonesia were ordered to close. Most Indonesian pharmacies sold oxygen cylinders to the public.

Singapore launched legal action that could lead to massive fines against Indonesian companies blamed for farm and plantation fires spewing unhealthy levels of air pollution over the city-state. Singapore also launched its own supplies for its residents, mainly to those elderly households who are very vulnerable to the haze with the distribution of AIR+ smart masks to 29,000 elderly residents along with WeCare PAcks, which contain food and essential items like eyedrops, vitamin C tablets, biscuits, instant noodles and canned food. In Thailand, Songkhla Province governor Songpol Sawasditham set up a "war room" to provide aid to affected residents and to combat the impact of smog from Indonesian forest fires. The Thai government also launched an application called Air4ASEAN that tracked the spread of the haze from the Indonesian fires, and monitored the air quality in different countries.

== Criticism of responses ==
Residents and non-governmental organisations in Riau and Central Kalimantan complained about the lack of aid and inaction from the Indonesian government over the ongoing forest fires. An NGO (non-governmental organisation) called the "Mandate of People's Suffering" as well as some Riau residents even wrote to the Malaysian government requesting aid. Some residents and leaders in Riau claimed that the central government was intentionally providing a slow and inadequate response, although the situation had been worsening over time. They explained that foreign aid had been blocked, even though the government had shown an inability to combat the fires itself, and that sub-standard masks were handed out to locals. The Indonesian government was also criticised for promising to cut CO_{2} emissions by 20% but failing to provide any commitment to zero deforestation as the country has overtaken Brazil in terms of deforestation. Indonesia has received a new record from the Guinness World Records as the country with the fastest destruction of forest due to fire. During the crisis, Indonesia surpassed the United States as the second largest producer of CO_{2} in the world due to the haze, just behind China. The haze, which sent air pollution levels up to 'very unhealthy' levels in neighbouring Malaysia and Singapore, also affected the Pacific nations of Guam, Palau and the Northern Marianas. Guam's Office of Homeland Security and Civil Defence spokesperson Jenna Gaminde warned the public to expect the haze to reduce visibility and adversely affect those with respiratory issues. Western Melanesia was currently susceptible to winds from Typhoon Koppu and Champi pulling smoke plumes from vast fires in Indonesia and Papua New Guinea. The World Resources Institute said in an October report that since early September, carbon emissions from the fires had exceeded average US daily output on 26 out of 44 days. If the haze continues until next year, the haze could be the worst haze crisis in Southeast Asia since the 1997 Southeast Asia haze. Robert Field, a NASA scientist from Columbia University, stated:

If the forecasts for a longer dry season hold, this suggests 2015 will rank among the most severe events on record.

Weak enforcement of environmental laws have been criticised; in previous forest burnings, many of the perpetrators, who mostly comprised employees of Indonesian palm oil companies, had been caught with strong evidence of criminal activity but still managed to escape from getting heavier penalties.

A group of Malaysians gathered in front of the Indonesian embassy in Kuala Lumpur to show their protest over Indonesia's illegal fires. In Thailand, around 50 Thais held a peaceful protest in front of the Indonesian consulate in Songkhla to demand that the Indonesian government expedite their action in combating the fires. Another 20 Thais representing the "Hatyai-Songkhla Residents Affected by Haze from Indonesia" group also sent a letter to the Indonesian consulate asking Indonesia to take responsibility and give its commitment to solve the issue. Tensions also arose with Singapore when Singapore's largest supermarket NTUC FairPrice withdrew paper products made by an Indonesian company, Asia Pulp & Paper (APP) as APP was named as one of the companies responsible for the haze.

== Reactions ==
Indonesia – President Joko Widodo has instructed government agencies to revoke the permits of any palm oil companies involved in the burning of forests and urged the arrest of those responsible. While Jokowi conceded in September 2015 that the recurrent haze was "not a problem that you can solve quickly", he insisted that Indonesia had "gone to great lengths" to tackle the problem, and declared: "You will see results soon and in three years we will have solved this". Around 25,000 Indonesian National Armed Forces troops had been deployed to battle the fires. While Indonesian Member of Parliament (MP) Hamdhani Mukhdar Said apologised to both Malaysia and Singapore over the haze, Indonesia's Vice-President Jusuf Kalla restated his position that Indonesia has no obligation to apologise to neighbouring countries for the haze caused by "forest fires" lasting "a month at the most" when these countries were not "grateful" for the "months" of "fresh air from our green environment and our forests when there are no fires". In a separate speech, Kalla said that Indonesia is "open", and requested that "Singapore, please come if you want to help. Don't just talk". However, Indonesian Environment and Forestry Minister Siti Nurbaya Bakar had earlier rejected any Singaporean offers to help Indonesia by stating that Indonesia had enough resources to deal with the crisis. October saw the Indonesian National Board for Disaster Management (BNPB) requesting help from Malaysia, Singapore or other countries to secure bigger aerial firefighting aircraft for Indonesia, around the same time as the Indonesian cabinet finally agreed to receive international help with the crisis, with President Jokowi declaring that Indonesia was now "working with a number of countries including Singapore", and other officials saying that Russia had also offered to help. Cabinet Secretary Pramono Anung explained why Indonesia had earlier rejected Singapore's help, saying that "if we are assisted, the government does not want them to claim the credit".

Malaysia – Prime Minister Najib Razak has demanded Indonesia take action against companies responsible for illegal forest fires blanketing parts of Southeast Asia in smoke, adding "Only Indonesia alone can gather evidence and convict the companies concerned". Meanwhile, Malaysian Education Minister Mahdzir Khalid has stated "We will not compromise with anything that may bring harm to our children in schools". The Malaysian government has called Indonesia to ratify a new memorandum of understanding to tackle transboundary haze. According to Malaysian Minister of Natural Resources and Environment Wan Junaidi Tuanku Jaafar the MoU would let both countries "assisting and exchange ideas with each other in the case of jungle and peat soil fires while requiring Indonesia to comply with its side of the bargain". The Fire and Rescue Department of Sarawak has ready to assist in putting out peat fires in Pontianak, Kalimantan, Indonesia if it is instructed to do. Malaysian military has also offered to help Indonesia to fight fires in both Sumatra and Kalimantan as stated by Malaysian Defence Minister Hishammuddin Hussein.

Singapore – On 3 June 2015, preceding both the dry season and the 2015 haze crisis, the Singaporean government offered Indonesia an 'assistance package' to combat haze; Singapore said assistance had been "consistently" offered "since 2005". The 2015 offer included three C-130 aircraft, one Chinook helicopter and a Singapore Civil Defence Force team. The offer to deal with the crisis was again reiterated to Indonesia in September when Singapore was then affected by the haze. At first, Indonesia accepted the offers but rejected it under a recent statement by its Environment and Forestry Minister as confirmed by its ministry's chief spokesman, Mr Eka Soegiri. Singapore has since reiterated the offer according to its former Minister for Environment and Water Resources, Dr Vivian Balakrishnan. Dr Vivian also delivered Singapore's national statement at the United Nations (UN) Sustainable Development Summit 2015 on 27 September 2015 at the UN Headquarters in New York US. The Summit has adopted the 2030 Agenda for Sustainable Development, a long-term global development framework that includes a set of 17 Sustainable Development Goals. In the statement, Minister Balakrishnan also called for closer regional and international co-operation on the issue of transboundary haze pollution in Southeast Asia. On 7 October 2015, after the haze had affected parts of Southeast Asia for more than a month, Indonesia finally accepted Singapore's offer to help. Singapore's Ministry of Foreign Affairs said the request was sent via the Indonesian embassy in Singapore.

Thailand – Prime Minister Prayut Chan-o-cha ordered its Foreign Ministry co-operate closely with neighbouring countries to tackle the chronic problem that has gripped parts of Southeast Asia. He also instructed officials in each affected province to spray water in the air to help improve visibility and to supply masks to the public. Thailand has said that they would push for ASEAN-level efforts to combat the haze. The Thai government has also offered them help in tackling the haze problem according to its Foreign Ministry deputy permanent secretary Vitavas Srivihok, as the Indonesian envoy had admitted his country's efforts alone were not enough to stop the fires.

== See also ==
- Social and environmental impact of palm oil
- Oil palm
