= Berau Coal Energy =

Company in Indonesia

PT Berau Coal Energy Tbk.
- Type: Public
- Traded as: IDX: BRAU
- ISIN: ID1000116502
- Founded: 26 April 1983; 43 years ago
- Headquarters: Jakarta, Indonesia
- Key people: Bob Kamandanu, President Commissioner; Amir Sambodo, President Director, Deswandhy Agusman, Vice President Commissioner
- Revenue: ▲US$507 million (2012)
- Website: www.beraucoalenergy.co.id

PT Berau Coal Energy Tbk is a major coal producer based in Jakarta, Indonesia. It was Indonesia's fifth largest coal producer as of 2013.

== History ==
Berau Coal Energy was created in 1983, following the signing of a contract with the Indonesian government as sole mining contractor within the Berau regency of East Kalimantan. Production began in 1994.

== Production ==
The mining company operates three active mines (Lati, Sambarata and Binungan) at a single site in East Kalimantan. Berau Coal has an estimated resources of about 2.6 billion tons, with probable and proven reserves estimated at 512 million tons (mt), lie within a single concession of around 118,400 hectares.

All three mines produce thermal coal, using conventional open pit mining techniques, primarily to supply the Chinese market.

== Controversies ==
Berau Coal became a part of Vallar plc, after British financier Nathaniel Rothschild acquired a controlling stake in the company for £700m in July 2010.

In 2013, it was variously reported that $173 million had allegedly gone "missing" or that "mysteriously vanished" or that a withdrawal was "unauthorised" from Berau Coal under Rosan Roeslani's leadership. Roeslani disputed the claims.

As part of an effort to restructure and take control of the business, Rothschild offered to fund US$100 million into Berau Coal and offered sign a restructuring support agreement with creditors in February 2015.

After a series of internal disputes, disagreements and investigations turned into "financial irregularities" at Berau Coal, Amir Sambodo agreed to resign in March 2015 as the president of Berau Coal. However, he failed to give up the position and refused to allow Asia Resource Minerals's chief financial officer, chief mining officer or his successor into the head office of Berau Coal. For a while, executives acting on behalf of Rothschild only had limited access to Berau Coal's accounting systems and bank account information.

The Widjaja's Sinar Mas subsidiary company, Asia Coal Energy Ventures, led by the Fuganto Widjaja together with Argyle Street Management Ltd., responded with a cash offer and alternative recapitalisation plan in 7 May 2015 involving a $150 million cash injection and a restructuring support agreement similar to the one offered by Rothschild earlier. In response Rothschild gave up his long conflict for ARM and agreed to sell his 17.2% stake in June 2015.

Rothschild's holding company later commented on the affair that "This will be our first and last investment in Indonesia’s coal sector"

Defaults

Berau Capital Resources Pte issued US$450 million worth of 12.5% guaranteed senior secured notes, in 2015. PT Berau Coal Energy also issued US$500 million worth of 7.25% guaranteed senior notes in 2017. While these were to be restructured under an agreement with bondholders, the company later did not proceed with the deal. Both the 2015 and 2017 notes are currently in default. Since July 2015, the Berau Group has brought 4 separate rounds of scheme of arrangement / moratorium proceedings, with terms which have been described as "frankly insulting" at a time when global coal prices had doubled. None of the schemes has succeeded.

Suspension from the IDX

Berau Coal Energy has been delisted from the IDX since 16 November 2017, following multiple suspensions over the course of the last 2 years and failure to submit timely annual reports and financial statements since 2014.

New York Court Case

In April 2019, following the default of two bonds worth about US$1 billion, the Widjaja family was taken to court in New York by investors in Berau coal, seeking damages of US$165M plus interest. Legal advisers for the plaintiffs, a New York hedge fund, claimed in court that many of the tactics employed by the Widjaja family during the APP restructuring were being deployed again. The Financial Times noted that the case came as "concerns build over Indonesia’s political and economic environment".

== See also ==
- Sinar Mas Group
- Asia Pulp and Paper
- Asia Resource Minerals
- Eka Tjipta Widjaja
- Fuganto Widjaja
