= Leila McDougall =

Australian filmmaker

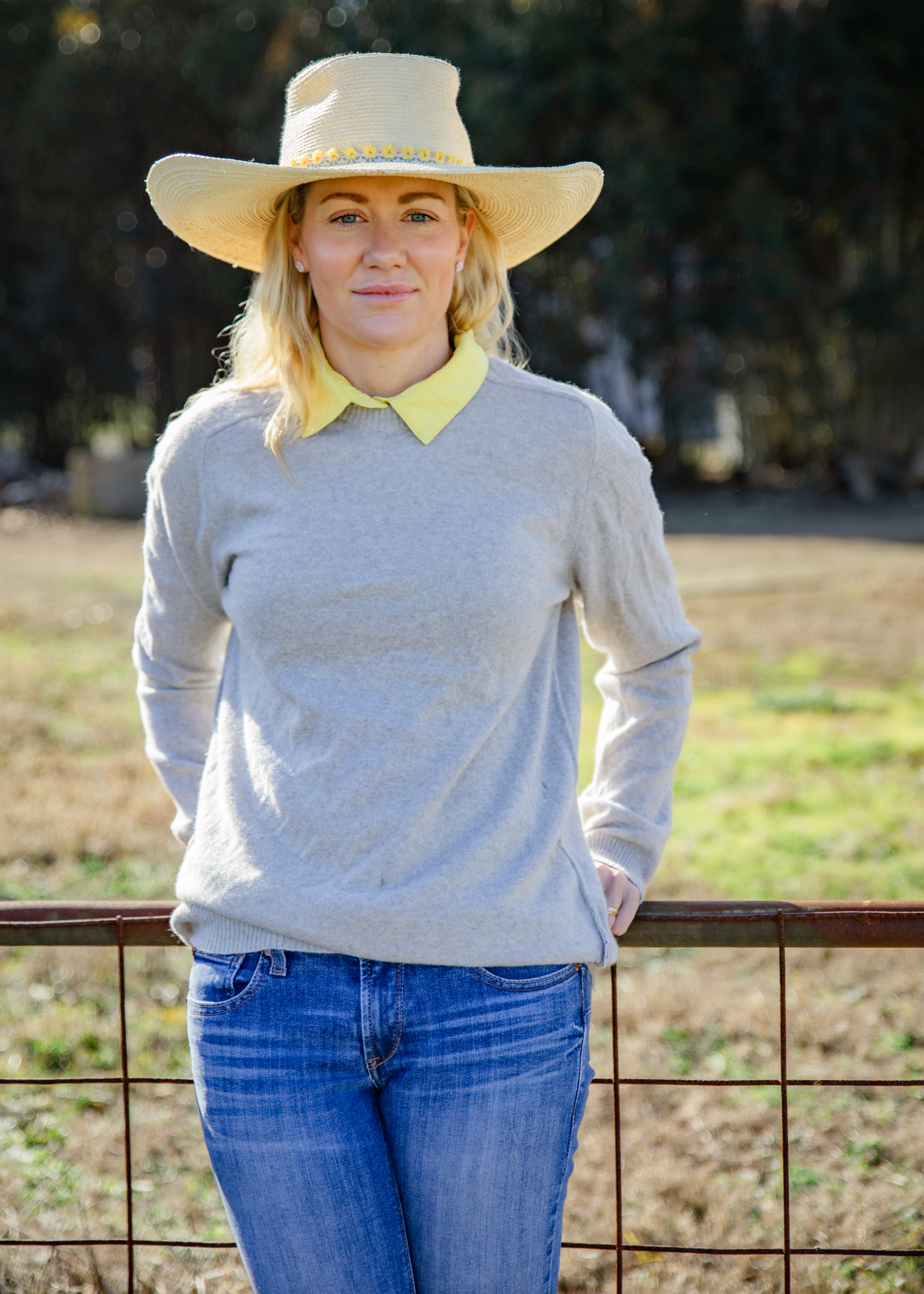
Leila McDougall, Australian filmmaker, producer, and mental health advocate, known for her work on the award-winning film Just A Farmer (2024).

Leila McDougall is an Australian filmmaker, writer, and advocate known for her work on the feature film Just A Farmer (2024). The film addresses mental health challenges in rural communities and has been recognized for sparking critical conversations about the well-being of farming families.

She is also the Founder and Owner of VAM Paddock Productions, a regional film production company focused on storytelling that uplifts rural voices.

Leila McDougall is also a Beyond Blue Rural Ambassador and a 2026 Victorian Australian of the Year nominee for her advocacy in mental health awareness across rural Australia.

== Early life and education ==
Leila McDougall was raised in Walcha, New South Wales, a rural farming community that influenced her later work in filmmaking and advocacy. She attended the New England Girls School in Armidale and later pursued a Bachelor of Education at Charles Sturt University and a Bachelor of Fashion Design at the Raffles Institute of Commerce and Design.

Leila Sweeney-McDougall has openly spoken about her experiences living with dyslexia, which has influenced her creative approach and commitment to inclusive education and communication.

== Career ==
=== Beginnings in film ===
Leila McDougall transitioned to filmmaking from a background in education and fashion design. Her rural upbringing and professional experiences shaped her storytelling, particularly in addressing social issues like mental health.

Alongside her filmmaking, she continues to explore fashion design using Australian wool, with her creations featured at major events — including a gown she designed and wore at the Australian of the Year Awards in 2025.

In addition to her creative work, Sweeney-McDougall is an active keynote speaker, addressing themes such as mental health in farming communities, rural women’s leadership, and the importance of storytelling as a bridge for awareness and healing.

=== Breakthrough with Just A Farmer ===
Leila McDougall's breakthrough came in 2024 with the release of Just A Farmer, a feature film she wrote, produced, and served as the executive producer. The film provides a heartfelt and unfiltered depiction of the challenges faced by farming families, particularly focusing on the impact of mental health struggles and the ripple effects of loss. Drawing from real-life experiences and extensive research, McDougall crafted a narrative that has not only resonated with farming communities but has also sparked vital conversations about mental health on a global scale.

=== Festival success and critical acclaim ===
Just A Farmer has been celebrated at numerous prestigious film festivals around the world, earning critical acclaim and several awards:

- Saint-Tropez Antipodes Film Festival (Saint-Tropez, France, 2024) – Winner: Audience Choice Award
- The Iris Global Health Film Festival (Boulder, Colorado, USA, 2024) – Winner: Best Narrative Feature
- Buffalo International Film Festival (Buffalo, New York, USA, 2024) – Winner: Best Narrative Feature
- International Film Festival of Australia (Melbourne, Australia, 2024) – Winner: Best Film, Best Cinematography (Gavin John Head), Best Supporting Actress (Susan Prior)
- Additional screenings at the St. Louis International Film Festival and This Is My Brave Australia International Film Festival have further solidified the film's impact.

== Philanthropy and community involvement ==
Leila McDougall's work in advocacy extends to her involvement in the Young Farmers Advisory Council and her recognition as the Emerging Leader in Agriculture in 2014.

She also served as an advisor to the Young Farmers Advisory Council under the Agricultural Minister of Victoria, helping shape policy and support for young farmers.

=== Filmography ===
- Just A Farmer (2024) – Writer, producer, executive producer

== Awards and recognition ==
- Best Narrative Feature at The Iris Global Health Film Festival
- Best Narrative Feature at the Buffalo International Film Festival
- Audience Choice Award at the Saint-Tropez Antipodes Film Festival
- Best Film and Best Cinematography at the International Film Festival of Australia
- Victorian Australian of the Year Nominee (2026)
