= Michael Widjaja =

Chinese-Indonesian businessman

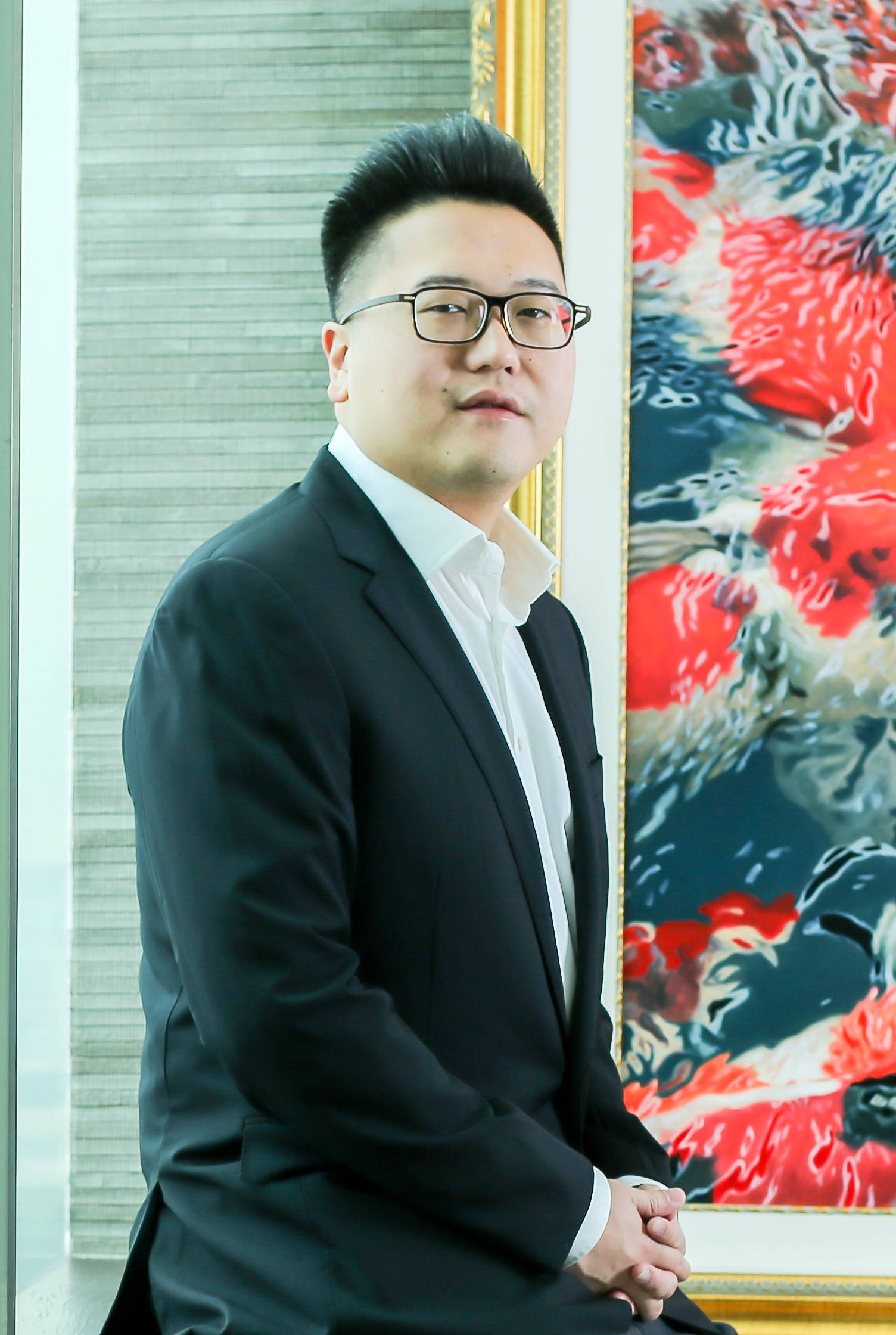
- Born: July 9, 1984 (age 41); Surabaya, East Java, Indonesia
- Education: University of Southern California
- Occupation: Businessman
- Years active: 2007–present
- Known for: CEO Sinar Mas Land
- Spouse: Feiny Sabur (wife) (m. 2012)
- Father: Muktar Widjaja
- Website: sinarmasland.com

Michael Widjaja (born July 9, 1984) is an Indonesian businessman of Chinese descent, and the CEO of Sinar Mas Land Group as well as Vice President Director of PT Bumi Serpong Damai Tbk (BSDE). Michael was born in Surabaya, 9 July 1984. Michael Jackson Purwanto Widjaja is the thirdborn of Muktar Widjaja, thereby a grandson of tycoon Eka Tjipta Widjaja founder of Sinar Mas Group.

Michael married Feiny Sabur at the age of 28 on 1 October 2012. He marks the third generation successor of the Sinar Mas.

== Early life and education ==
Michael was raised in Singapore, in 2002-2006, he studied International Relations and Global Business at the University of Southern California, Los Angeles, US, from which he earned his Bachelor of Arts. Soon after, he started his career at PT Duta Pertiwi under the direct supervision of his father Muktar Widjaja.

== Career ==
Michael Widjaja is the CEO of Sinar Mas Land Group as well as Vice President Director of PT Bumi Serpong Damai Tbk (BSDE). Before this, Widjaja worked for: EuroRev Inc, Los Angeles, 2003, PT Arara Abadi, Indonesia, 2003, Top Tier Trading, Los Angeles, 2005, Vice President Director of PT Duta Pertiwi Tbk, 2007- 2015, Vice President Commissioner of PT Dian Swastika Sentosa Tbk, 2009 - 2011, Commissioner of PT Golden Energy Mines Tbk, 2011- 2013.
