= Kota Deltamas =

Indonesian township

Coordinates: 6.364°S 107.178°E

Kota Deltamas (Delta Mas City) is an integrated industrial, commercial and residential township at Cikarang, West Java, Indonesia. The township located between Jakarta and Bandung city, which has land area of about 3000 hectares. It is being developed by Indonesian conglomerate Sinar Mas Land and Japanese Sojitz.

The township has residential, commercial and industrial area, supported by other civic amenities. Residential area is about 26% of the total land area of Kota Deltamas. Administrative offices of Bekasi regency are located within the township,

== Industrial park ==
The industrial estate of the township is known as Greenland International Industrial Center(GIIC), which has land area of 1500 hectares. Several global investors, such as Mitsubishi and Suzuki, have established their manufacturing facilities there.

== Facilities ==
- ÆON Mall
- Le Premier Hotel
- Sakura Park Hotel and Residence
- Sancrest serviced apartment
- ITSB
- Jakarta International University campus
- Pangudi Luhur School
- Deltamas Sports-center
- Malibu Clubhouse
- Pasadena Serenade Swimming Pool
- K-Education Complex

== Transportation ==
The township has direct access to Jakarta-Cikampek Toll Road at KM 37. Shuttle buses are available within the township.

== See also ==
- Cikarang
- Jabodetabek
- Sinar Mas Group
