= Hoaxes in Singapore =

The first hoax reported in Singapore was in 1805, when the Bukit Timah Monkey Man was reported for the first time. Depending on the subject and type of the hoax, it's been reported to Singapore Police Force, there may be an investigation by the Criminal Investigation Department and subsequently a possible a stern warning or prosecution by the AGC.

== Hoaxes ==
- 1805: Bukit Timah Monkey Man, commonly abbreviated as BTM or BTMM, is a cryptid said to inhabit Singapore
- 1910: Dreadnought hoax, Royal Navy officers are reported as taking revenge, in the Singapore Free Press and Mercantile Advertiser.
- 2005: National Kidney Foundation Singapore scandal, also known as the NKF saga, NKF scandal, or NKF controversy.
- 2015: Death Hoax, on 18 March 2015, a death hoax website falsely reported that Lee Kuan Yew, the first prime minister of Singapore, had died.
- 2015: 2015 Voluntary non-work day, Ministry of Manpower (Singapore), MOM lodges police report as a Hoax post appeared on social media.
- 2015: NTUC FairPrice warns netizens about fake $100 coupon on Facebook.

== See also ==
- List of email scams
- List of hoaxes
- Chemtrail conspiracy theory
- Murphy's law
