= Sinar Mas Land =

Indonesian real estate development company

- Company type: Subsidiary
- Industry: Real estate development
- Headquarters: Tangerang, Indonesia
- Key people: Muktar Widjaja, Chairman. Leah Widjaja, Vice Chairman. Michael Widjaja, Group CEO.
- Revenue: ▲ Rp 11.87 trillion (2016)
- Net income: ▲ Rp 1.55 trillion (2016)
- Total assets: ▲ Rp 82.16 trillion (2016)
- Parent: Sinar Mas Group
- Website: www.sinarmasland.com

Sinar Mas Land is an Indonesian real estate development company, which is a subsidiary of Sinar Mas Group. It combines two big developers, Bumi Serpong Damai and Duta Pertiwi. It formed in 1988 under the flag of Duta Pertiwi. It now holds substantial interests in a businesses including residential housing, apartments, shopping centers, hotels, office buildings, industrial estates, townships and cities. Its head office building, designed by Aedas, is located in the BSD Green Office Park in Jakarta and received a high commendation under Indonesia’s office architecture at Asia Pacific Property Awards 2014.

== Attached companies and investments ==
Sinar Mas Land is the holding company for a number of subsidiaries.

=== City and township projects ===
Sinar Mas Land city development consists of two major projects: City (BSD City and Kota Deltamas) and Township (Kota Wisata and Grand Wisata). Each city encompasses an area of more than 1,000 hectares.

- BSD City
- Kota Deltamas
- Kota Wisata
- Grand Wisata

=== Residential projects ===
- Balikpapan Baru
- Banjar Wijaya
- Grand City - Balikpapan
- Legenda Wisata
- Li Shui Jin Du - Chengdu
- Li Shui Jin Yang - Shenyang
- Taman Duta Mas Batam
- Taman Permata Buana
- Telaga Golf - Sawangan
- Wisata Bukit Mas Surabaya

=== Commercial and industrial projects ===
- BSD Techno Park
- Greenland International Industrial City (GIIC) Deltamas
- Karawang International Industrial City (KIIC)
- Orchard Towers - Singapore
- Plaza BII
- Wisma BCA - BSD City
- Wisma BII Medan
- Wisma BII Surabaya
- Wisma Eka Jiwa

=== Retail and trade centre projects ===
- ITC Mangga Dua
- Mal Mangga Dua
- Harco Mas Mangga Dua
- Epicentrum Walk
- Plaza Indonesia
- DP Mall Semarang
- ITC BSD
- The Breeze
- AEON Mall BSD
- ITC Cempaka Mas
- ITC Kuningan
- Mal Ambassador
- ITC Depok
- ITC Fatmawati
- ITC Kuningan
- ITC Permata Hijau
- ITC Roxy Mas
- ITC Surabaya Mega Wholesale
- Mal Ambasador
- Mal Mangga Dua

=== Hotel, resort and golf course projects ===
- Damai Indah Golf - BSD
- Damai Indah Golf - PIK
- Grand Hyatt
- Kota Bunga
- Le Grandeur Balikpapan
- Le Grandeur Jakarta
- Le Grandeur Palm Resort - Johor
- Palm Spring Golf - Batam
- Sedana Golf - Karawang
- Le Premier Kota Deltamas
