= Axis Telecom =

Cellular telecommunication service provider of Indonesia

AXIS
- Product type: Telecommunications
- Current owner: XLSMART
- Country: Indonesia
- Introduced: 23 April 2008; 18 years ago (original); 30 March 2015; 11 years ago (relaunch)
- Related brands: XL; Smartfren
- Markets: Nationwide
- Previous owners: Axis Telekom Indonesia
- Tagline: "#EmangKitaBeda"
- Website: www.axis.co.id

Axis (stylized in all caps as AXIS) is an Indonesian cellular service brand operated by XLSMART. It provides 2G, 4G, and 5G services nationwide and covers the world through 382 international roaming partners in 159 countries.

== Acquisition by XL Axiata ==
XL Axiata has signed an agreement to acquire Axis Telekom Indonesia, on 26 September 2013.

Merrill Lynch (Singapore) Pte Ltd (Bank of America Merrill Lynch) acted as financial advisor for this transaction from XL.

== Brand identity ==
=== Slogans ===
- GSM Yang Baik (Good GSM, 2008–2014)
- Selalu Memberi Lebih (Always Give More, 2009–2010, secondary)
- Semakin Bisa (The more you can, 2014–2015)
- Irit Itu Axis (Save on Axis, 2015–2019)
- #KenapaNggak (#WhyNot, 2019–2023)
- #EmangKitaBeda (#WeAreDifferent, 2023–sekarang)

=== Logo ===
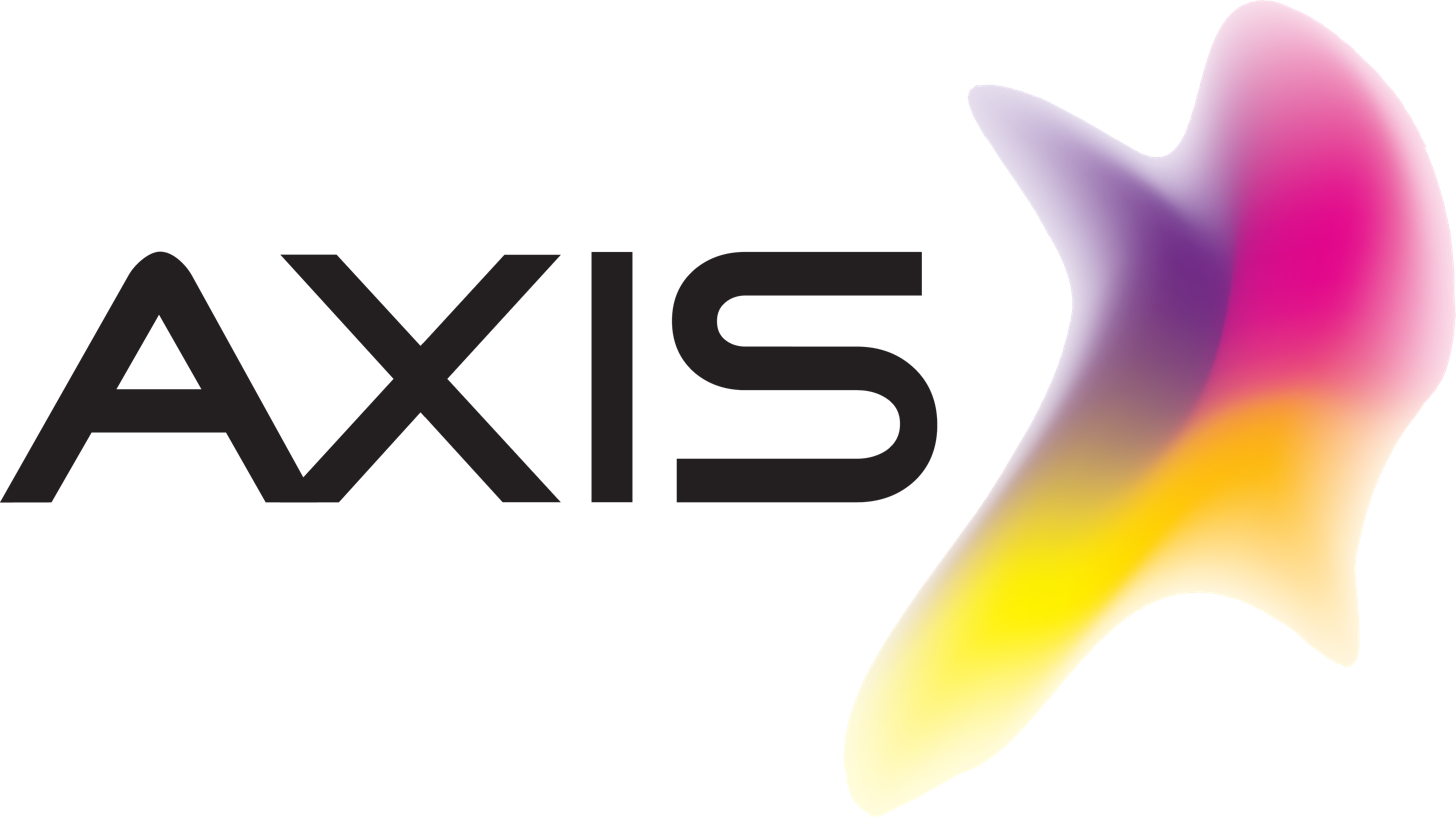
First Axis logo, 2008–2014

The second logo of Axis after being acquired by XL Axiata, 8 April 2014–30 March 2015
