= Nei Xue Tang Museum =

Museum in Singapore

Coordinates: 1.2751°N 103.8390°E

The Nei Xue Tang Museum ("Hall of Inner Learning") (Chinese: 内学堂) is a private museum of Buddhist art in Singapore. It is the first home museum in Singapore.

The museum was created by collector Woon Wee Teng under a program enacted by the Singapore government to allow collectors to show their collections in their own homes. Opened in 2005, the collection is located in a four-storey pre-war house built in the Peranakan style on Cantonment Road. It is Singapore's first home museum. The museum is by invitation only.

Singaporean billionaire businessman, Oei Hong Leong, houses most of his 50,000-piece collection of Buddhist artifacts at the Museum.

In 2007, Woon announced plans for a much larger museum to house more Buddhist artifacts. Oei subsequently bought the museum but decided not to expand the museum.

== See also ==
- List of museums in Singapore
- Japanese sculpture
- Khmer sculpture
- Korean Buddhist sculpture
- Lao Buddhist sculpture
- Thai art
- Thai Buddhist sculpture
