= XLSmart =

Indonesian telecommunications company

PT XLSMART Telecom Sejahtera Tbk
- Trade name: XLSMART
- Formerly: Grahametropolitan Lestari (1989–1996); Excelcomindo Pratama (1996–2009); XL Axiata (2009–2025)
- Type: Public
- Traded as: IDX: EXCL
- Industry: Telecommunications
- Founded: October 6, 1989; 37 years ago
- Founder: Peter Sondakh (Rajawali Wirabhakti Utama)
- Headquarters: Jakarta, Indonesia
- Key people: Rajeev Sethi (President and CEO)
- Brands: XL; Axis; Smartfren
- Services: Telecommunications services
- Revenue: IDR 34.40 trillion (2024)
- Net income: IDR 1.85 trillion (2024)
- Total assets: IDR 86.17 trillion (2024)
- Owners: Axiata (34,8%); Sinar Mas (34,8%); Public float (30,4%)
- Number of employees: 10,500 (2024)
- Website: www.xlsmart.co.id

PT XLSMART Telecom Sejahtera Tbk (stylized as XLSMART), formerly PT Excelcomindo Pratama Tbk and PT XL Axiata Tbk, is an Indonesian mobile telecommunications services operator headquartered at Jakarta, jointly owned by Malaysia-based company Axiata and Indonesian diversified conglomerate Sinar Mas. It is the third largest mobile telecommunications company in Indonesia. The operator's coverage includes Java, Bali, and Lombok as well as the principal cities in and around Sumatra, Kalimantan and Sulawesi. XLSMART offers home and mobile communication broadband services through their 2G GSM, 4G LTE, 5G NR and optical fiber network infrastructure under the three core brands: XL, Axis, and Smartfren.

Initially, XLSMART provided cellular mobile telephony services using the GSM 900 technology. A few years after launching services, the company was awarded a license for implementing a DCS 1800 network, and to operate an ISP and VoIP service. In 2006, XL obtained a 3G license, which services launched in September of the same year. By 2025, the company had more than 209.000 BTS towers across Indonesia and has a subscriber's strength of 58,8 million users, making it the third largest mobile network operator in Indonesia behind Indosat and Telkomsel.

== History ==
Excelcomindo was established on October 6, 1989 under the name of PT Grahametropolitan Lestari and originally was a trading and general services company. XL became the first private mobile services operator in the country, starting commercial operations on October 8, 1996. In 2009, XL was bought by the Axiata Group which caused a change of logos. The XL letters were made blue (the blue and green version was also used), and an Axiata tag was added on to the logo. On October 28, 2014, XL launched the new logo with the launch of Real Mobile 4G LTE network service. On October 5, 2016, to commemorate XL's 20th anniversary, XL changed its logo colour from yellow and green to blue and green, similar to the colour in the first XL logo.

On 11 December 2024, XL announced that it will merge with Smartfren (owned by Sinar Mas) for IDR 104 trillion or USD 6,5 billion, creating the country's new telecommunication provider. XL will operate as the surviving entity and will be changing its name to XLSMART under the new company name of PT XLSMART Telecom Sejahtera. The merging process is expected to complete in the first half of 2025. During the Annual General Meeting of Shareholders on 25 March 2025, the board of director had changed, with Rajeev Sethi appointed as its new President Director. On the same day, XL approved the planned merger with Smartfren during the Extraordinary General Meeting of Shareholders, with the completion date set on 16 April 2025.

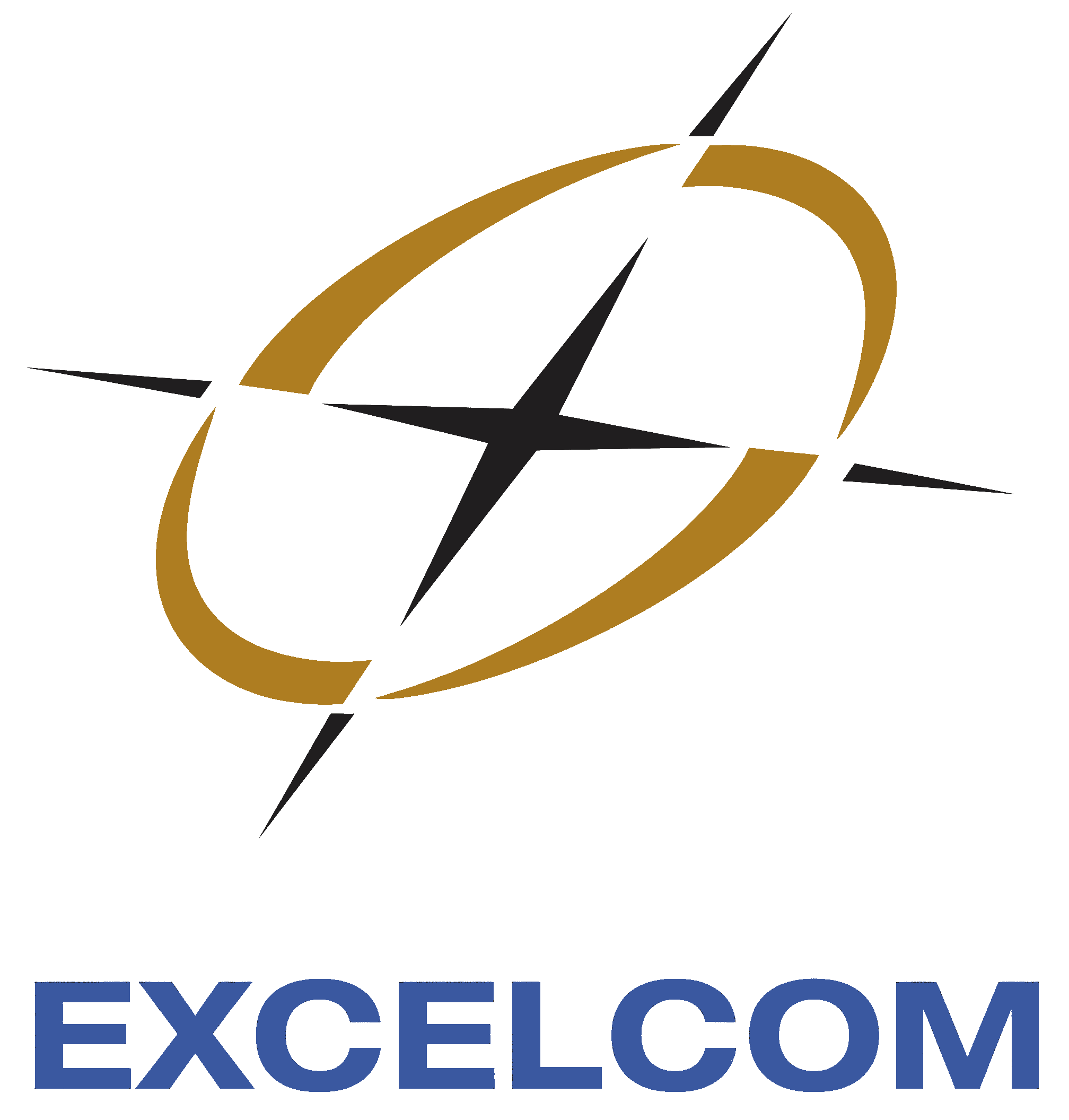
Corporate logo, used on 1995 to 1996

Original XL logo used from 8 October 1996 until 25 June 2004.

Pro XL logo used from 1998 until 25 June 2004.

Logo used from 25 June 2004 until September 2006

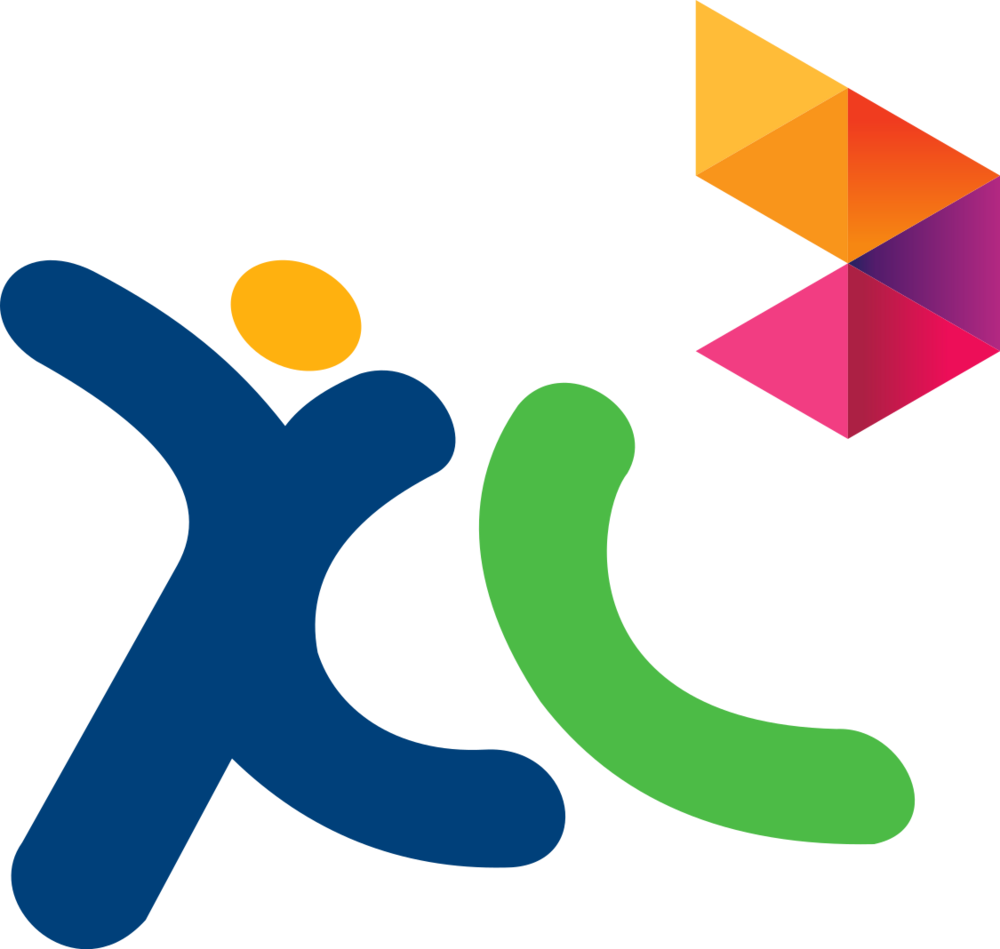
Previous XL logo used from September 2006 and an Axiata tag was added on to the logo on 8 June 2009.

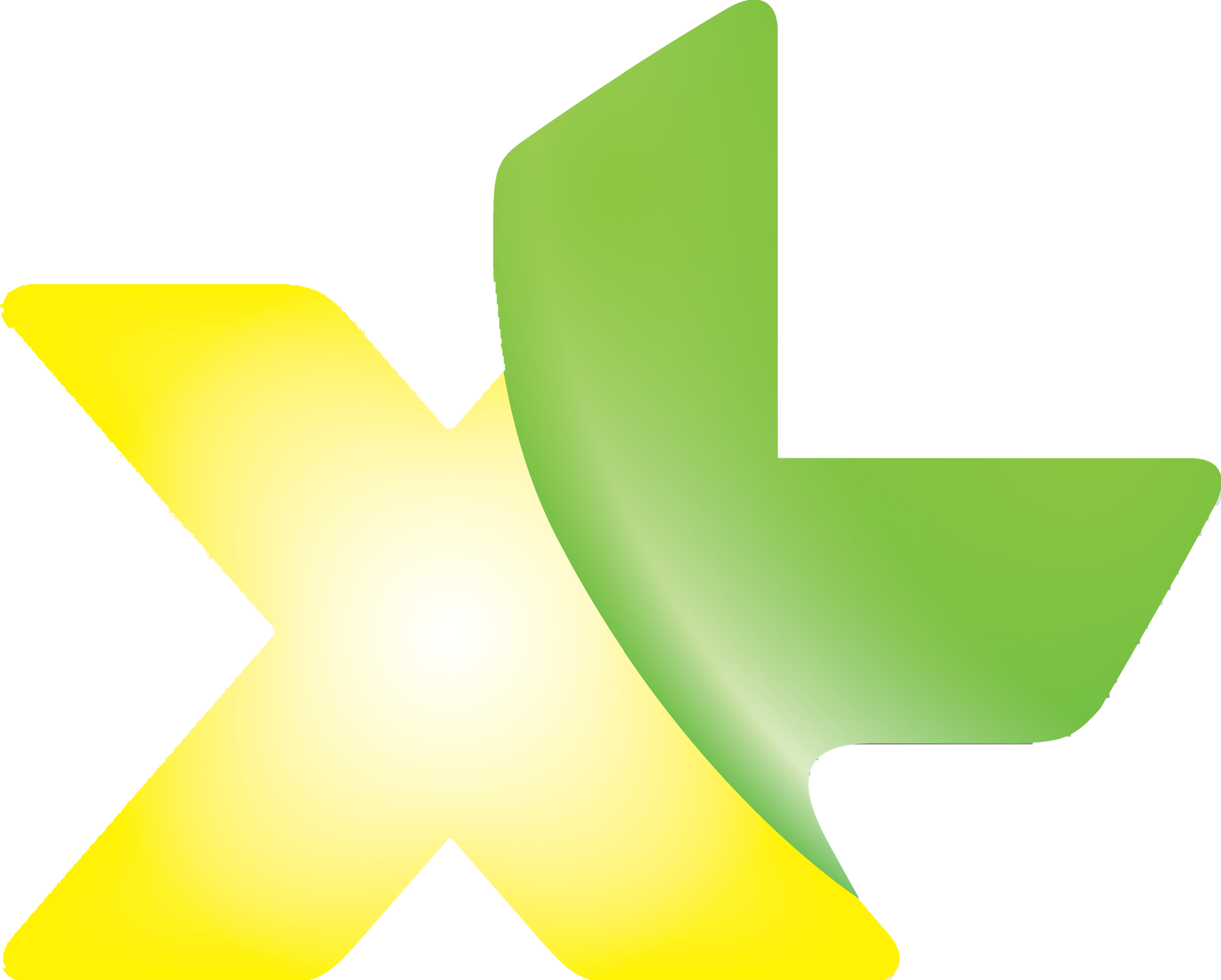
XL logo used from 28 October 2014 until 5 October 2016.

XL logo used since 5 October 2016.

XL Axiata corporate logo used from 28 October 2014 to 16 April 2025.

== Slogans ==
=== GSM XL (1996–2002) ===
- Langsung Kriiing.... (Directly Rings Up..., 8 October 1996 – 14 March 2002)

=== Pro XL (1998–2004) ===
- Tak Selalu Pilihan Anda yang Pro (Your Choice Isn't Always the Pro, 1 January 1998 – 31 December 1999)
- Anda yang Pro (You're the Pro, 1 January 2000 – 15 November 2001)
- Pilih yang Pro (Choose the Pro, 31 December 1997 – 15 November 2001)
- Tak Hanya Bicara (Not Just Talkin', 16 November 2001 – 25 June 2004)
- Bening Sepanjang Nusantara (Calling Throughout the Archipelago, 21 June 2003 – 25 June 2004)

=== Bebas (2004–2008) ===
- Puasnya, terasa 'kan? (It’s a great feeling, isnt it?, 2004–2006)
- Rasain Tuuh (Take Thaat, 2006)
- Pulsanya gak abis-abis! (The credit just never runs out!, 2007–2008)

=== Jempol (2004–2008) ===
- Bisa-Bisa aja (anything is possible, 2004 – September 2006)
- Semua Makin Dekat (Everyone's Getting Closer, September 2006–2007)
- Hemat Berkualitas (Quality Savings, 2007)

=== XL ===
- Makin Akrab, Makin Bersahabat (The More Familiar, The Friendlier, 25 June 2004 – 30 September 2004)
- Membuat Dunia Extra Small (Makes the World Extra Small, 1 October 2004 – 10 June 2006)
- Life Unlimited (11 June 2006 – 31 May 2007)
- Jangkauan Luas (Wide Reach, 1 June 2007 – 30 September 2008)
- Nyambung Teruuus (Keeps Connecting, 1 October 2008 – 31 May 2009)
- Jaringan Handal (The Reliable Network, 1 June 2009 – 11 August 2010)
- XLalu Untukmu (Always for You, 11 August 2010 – 30 September 2010)
- XLalu Bersamamu (Always Be With You, 1 October 2010 – 31 December 2010)
- XLalu Lebih Baik (Always Be Better, 1 January 2011 – 31 October 2011)
- XLangkah Lebih Maju (One Step Ahead, 1 November 2011 – 31 January 2013)
- Internet Tercepat (The Fastest Internet, 1 February 2013 – 27 October 2014)
- Sekarang, Bisa! (Now, You Can!, 28 October 2014 – 4 April 2018)
- Karena XL Bisa! (Because XL, We Can!, 5 April 2018 – 23 November 2020)
- #XtraBisa (#ExtraCapable, 24 November 2020 – 16 April 2025)
- Ini Cara Kita (This is Our Way!, 1 April 2021 – 26 February 2022)
- We Are More (26 February 2022 – 31 December 2025)
- Secepat Itu (That fast) (1 January 2026 – present)

=== XL Axiata/XLSMART ===
- #JadiLebihBaik (#BeBetter, 2018–2022)
- #AdaUntukAnda (#there for you, 2022–16 April 2025)
- Bersama, Melaju Tanpa Batas (Together, Moving Forward Without Limits, 16 April 2025 – present)

== High-bandwidth fibre-optic cable ==
Telekom Malaysia, Mora Telematika and XLSMART has been working cooperatively to build a high-bandwidth fibre-optic submarine cable, which will stretch 400 kilometers, between the state of Malacca and Batam, through Dumai, with a total cost of $7.6 million USD. Led by Huawei Marine Networks, the cables were completed on Q4 2011.

XLSMART, in partnership with Nextgen Group and 3 other partners, built the Australia Singapore Cable to connect Australia, Indonesia and Singapore. XL Axiata has a submarine beach cable facility and submarine cable landing station in Anyer, Banten to connect the Australia Singapore Cable to Indonesia.
