= Smartfren =

Wireless network provider in Indonesia

- Logo since 2022
- Product type: Telecommunications
- Current owner: XLSMART
- Country: Indonesia
- Introduced: 3 March 2010; 16 years ago
- Related brands: XL; Axis
- Markets: Nationwide
- Previous owners: Smartfren Telecom
- Website: www.smartfren.com

PT Smartfren Telecom Tbk
- Formerly: Mobile-8 Telecom (2002–2011)
- Type: public
- Traded as: IDX: FREN
- Industry: Telecommunications
- Predecessors: Komselindo; Telesera; Metrosel
- Founded: 2 December 2002; 23 years ago
- Defunct: 16 April 2025; 18 months ago
- Fate: Merged with XL Axiata to form XLSmart; brand retained by the merged company
- Successor: XLSMART
- Headquarters: Jl. H. Agus Salim No. 45, Jakarta Pusat; Jakarta, Indonesia
- Revenue: ▲ Rp 6.987 trillion (2019)
- Net income: ▲ Rp -2.187 trillion (2019)
- Total assets: ▲ Rp 27.65 trillion (2019)
- Total equity: ▲ Rp 12.735 trillion (2019)
- Parent: Sinar Mas

Smartfren (stylized in all-lowercase as smartfren) is an Indonesian wireless network operator headquartered in Central Jakarta, Indonesia. As of 2025, it is operated by XLSMART, a joint venture of Indonesian conglomerate Sinar Mas and Malaysia-based Axiata. Smartfren operates 4G LTE and 5G network after shifting away from CDMA technologies in 2014. As of 2018, Smartfren has 10.1 million active subscribers, making them the fifth-largest wireless carrier in the country.

Smartfren provides wireless voice (via VoLTE) and data services in Indonesia, which it claims is available in over 200 cities. In 2015, the company launched their LTE Advanced network, becoming the first in the country to do so.

On 11 December 2024, Smartfren announced that it will merge with XL Axiata for IDR 104 trillion, or USD 6.5 billion, creating a new telecommunications powerhouse in the country. The merger will result in Smartfren being absorbed into the new entity called XLSMART Telecom Sejahtera, with the merger expected to occur in the first half of 2025. The Smartfren services will continue to operate within the new entity, alongside XL and Axis. On 25 March 2025, XL approved the planned merger with Smartfren during the Extraordinary General Meeting of Shareholders, with the completion date set on 16 April 2025.

== Andromax ==
Smartfren partnered with some China-based smartphone manufacturers such as Hisense, Haier and ZTE to produce smart devices under the SMARTFREN Andromax brand. These phones operate on either CDMA 2000 1x or LTE on the newer models. They use the following naming scheme:

- C and G models denote lower-end smartphone models
- I and T models denote lower to midrange models
- U, V and Z models denote mid to high-end smartphones.

More recently, they also launched the E, Q and R models which have LTE capability; and the E2 and R2 models which supported VoLTE.

== Slogans ==
=== As Smart Telecom ===
- Smart, Hebat, Hemat lit. 'Smart, Awesome, Save' (2006–2011)

=== As Mobile-8 Telecom ===
==== Fren ====
- Kartu Selularku lit. 'My Cellular card' (2003–2006)
- Seluler Pilihan Cerdas lit. 'Smart Choice Cellular' (2006–2008)
- Murah, Tidak Repot. lit. 'Affordable, Hassle-free' (2008–2009)
- Hemat, Tidak Repot. lit. 'Save, Hassle-free' (2009–2011)

==== Hepi ====
- Pasti Lebih Untung lit. 'Clearly More Beneficial' (2008–2010)

=== As Smartfren ===
- Memberi Yang Terbaik lit. 'Giving the Best' (2010–2011)
- Live Smart (2011–2018)
- 4G Go For It (2015–2018, after Smartfren launched Andromax 4G LTE)
- Hebat, Hemat, Cepat lit. 'Awesome, Save, Fast' (2018–present)
- Juaranya Internet Unlimited lit. 'Champion of Unlimited Internet' (2018–2023)
- 100% Untuk Indonesia lit. '100% for Indonesia' (2023–2026)
- Jagoan Sinyal Se-Indonesia lit. 'Indonesia's Signal Expert' (2026–present)

=== Logo ===
First logo, 2010

2011–2019, used as the main logo in 2018–2019

2015–2018

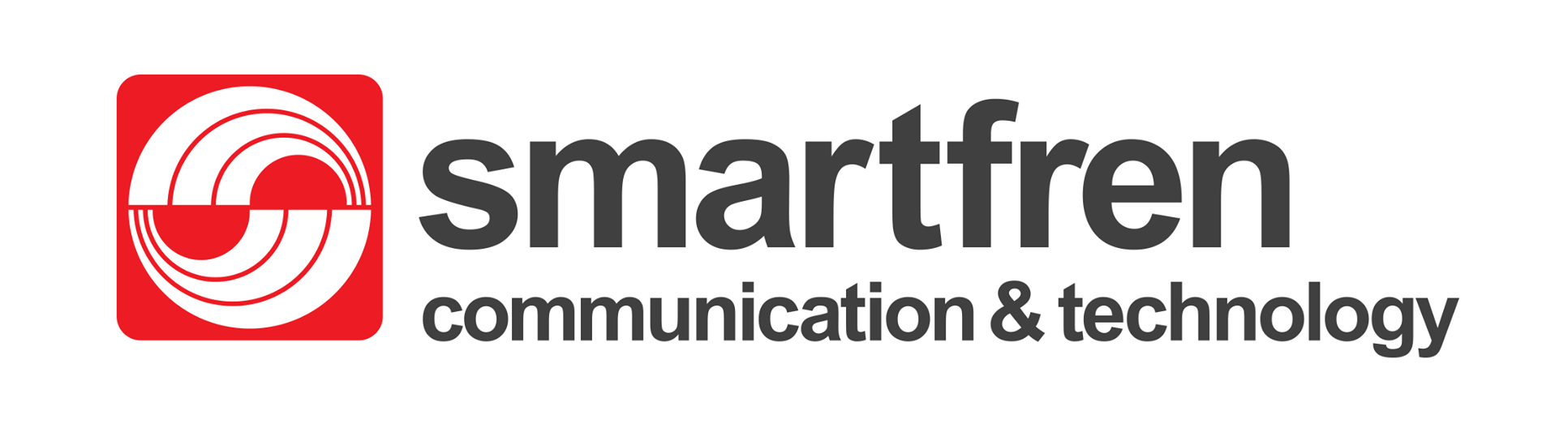
2018–2025 (corporate)

2019–2022
