= Raffles Design Institute =

For-profit art school in Singapore

Raffles Design Institute Singapore
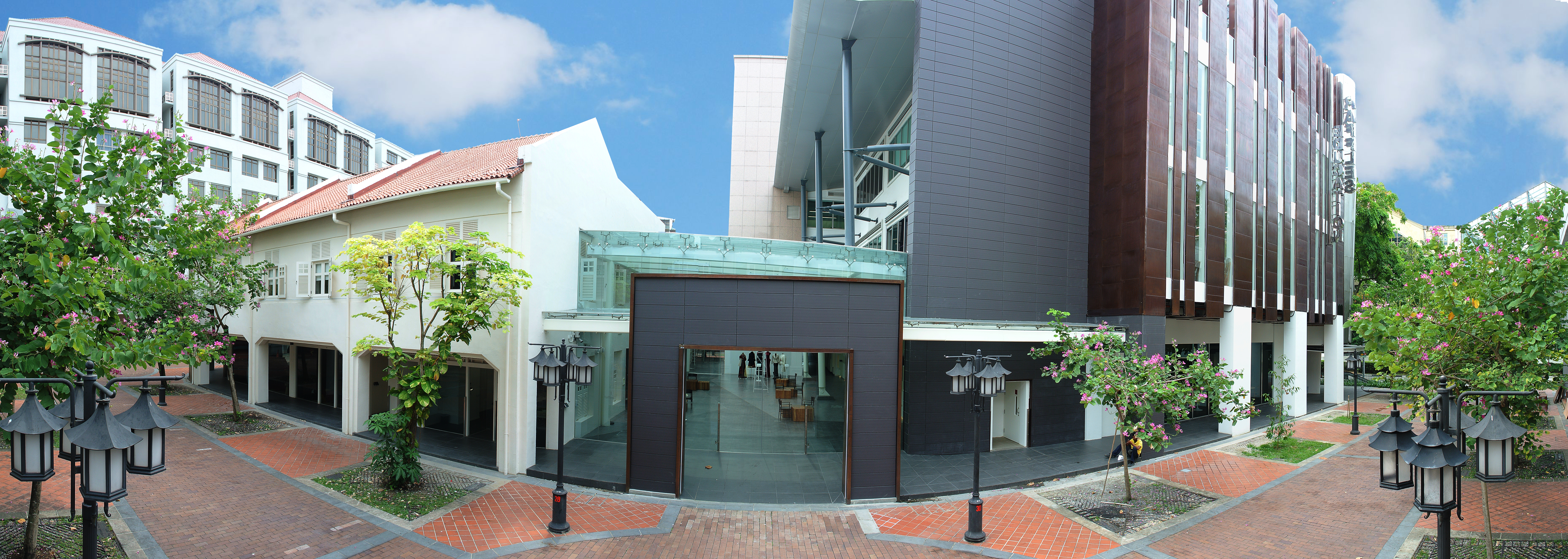

Location
- 111 Somerset Rd, #15-22 TripleOne Somerset; 238164; Singapore
- Coordinates: 1°17′20″N 103°50′37″E

Information
- Type: Private, for-profit
- Established: 1990; 36 years ago
- Director: Ong Kai How
- Principal: Giuseppe Spinelli
- Campus size: Multiple Storey
- Campus type: Urban
- Colours: Orange, gray
- Website: raffles-college.edu.sg

Raffles Design Institute is a for-profit education group and design-centric educational institution headquartered in Singapore. It is part of Raffles Education Limited.

== History ==
Founded in 1990, Raffles Design Institute is one of the first private institutions in Singapore to offer a Fashion Design course. Within five years, multiple design disciplines including Interactive Media Design, Visual Communication, Product Design, Jewellery Design, Interior Design, Games Design and Animation Design were introduced. Since establishment, the group has grown to provide a full spectrum of education services through a vast network of 16 educational institute across 9 countries in Asia Pacific and Europe: Cambodia, India, Indonesia, Italy, Malaysia, Saudi Arabia, Singapore, Thailand, and the People's Republic of China.

In 2004, Raffles Design Institute received the Singapore Quality Class Award for Private Education Organizations, ensuring that all courses were registered with the appropriate bodies. In 2005, the CaseTrust for Education Award for Private Education Organizations was awarded, which is an indication of approval by The Consumer Association of Singapore Enterprise. In 2008/2009, Edupoll recognized Raffles Design Institute as one of the Top Ten Education Provider [sic] in Singapore and the Largest and Most Global Private Education Provider in Singapore.

In February 2010, Raffles Design Institute, Raffles Merchandising Institute and Raffles School of Business were re-organized as institutes of Raffles College of Higher Education (Raffles Education).

The Group, through its Hong Kong Stock Exchange listed subsidiary, Oriental University City Holdings (H.K.) Ltd., leases education facilities to 12 educational institution offering a wide variety of vocational and technical courses.

== Establishments ==
=== Design Colleges ===
- Bangkok, Thailand
- Kuala Lumpur, Malaysia
- Phnom Penh, Cambodia
- Singapore
- Jakarta, Indonesia
- Mumbai, India
- Riyadh, Saudi Arabia
- Guangzhou, China
- Shanghai, China
- Milan, Italy

=== Universities & Vocational Schools ===
- Raffles University Iskandar Puteri, Malaysia
- Tianjin University of Commerce Boustead College, China
- Hefei Wanbao College, China

=== K-12 ===
- Suzhou Kindergarten, Suzhou China
- Raffles American School, Iskandar Puteri Malaysia
- Raffles American School, Bangkok, Thailand

=== Oriental University City ===
- 12 Educational Institutes, China

=== International Campuses ===
Raffles International College Bangkok, originally known as Raffles Design Institute Bangkok, is a 2.25 hectare campus located in the Bangna district of Bangkok, Thailand. It was awarded the title of "Best Design School" for outstanding achievement in the advancement of Arts and Design by Her Royal Highness Princess of Thailand Soamsawali in March 2007. However, in 2010, the school was found to be operating without the permission of the Higher Education Commission of Thailand, and had action taken against it by the Thai authorities. In November 2017, Raffles did not yet have a valid international college license, but in 2020 was listed as an accredited Thai Higher Education Institution by the Thai Ministry of Higher Education, Science, Research and Innovation.

Raffles' partner in its Indian Joint Venture, Educomp Solutions Ltd., was reported to be struggling financially, and divesting from many subsidiaries. This coincided with the closure of many of its colleges in India.

In 2012, the government of Vietnam ordered Raffles to cease operating the campuses in Hanoi and Ho Chi Minh (as Raffles had never obtained a license to provide higher education), and consequently 400 students had to be relocated to its other campuses.

In 2013, Raffles Education Corp signed agreements to establish a university in Negombo (Sri Lanka), and three colleges in Riyadh (Saudi Arabia), Batam and Medan (Indonesia). However, the proposed university in Negombo Sri Lanka was never built.

In October 2016, Raffles Design Institute shut down its Indian campus in Koramangala, Bungalore without warning, leaving over 160 students stranded with their education. By November 2016, the Raffles schools in Delhi, Bengaluru, Hyderabad and Chennai had been shuttered.

In March 2016, its Australian campus, Raffles College of Design and Commerce, lost TEQSA accreditation. On 26 November 2018, it applied to withdraw registration as an Australian higher education provider and began the process of closing down. Approval to withdraw was granted on 20 December 2018.

Raffles International Institute, its Ulaanbaatar campus (which had been operating since 2005, originally as Hartford Institute) failed to gain government recognition as a university and has never been accredited in Mongolia. It closed down in 2024.

== Controversies ==
In 2019, Chew Hua Seng, chairman of Raffles Education, was taken to court by the second largest shareholder, Oei Hong Leong, on allegations that the former had renegaded on an agreement to buy back the latter’s shares at a specific price. The court sided with the chairman.

Affin Bank, a Malaysian bank, filed writs against the company in May 2021 demanding repayment of a loan, amounting to over half the market capitalisation of the company. However, the company disclosed the writs only months later, a breach of the Securities and Futures Act. This resulted in the arrest of five Raffles Education directors, including its chairman and CEO, in February 2022 after investigations by the Monetary Authority of Singapore and the Commercial Affairs Department, on charges related to the Affin Bank loan. They were released on bail of S$30,000 each. In September 2024, all five were served charges "for disclosure related offences under the Securities and Futures Act", with each director facing two charges. The loan was repaid three years later.

In October 2021 further corporate governance concerns were raised when an independent auditor found that the company had $196.4 million of current liabilities and current assets of $96.8 million. In response, the company claimed it could continue as a going concern. Despite the shortfall, large sums of money were paid that year to the chairman and various family members. The company was eventually forced to disclose remuneration and benefits paid to every director of the company and its 81 subsidies. The shortfall issue resurfaced in October 2025, when an independent auditor highlighted "a material uncertainty related to going concern", as the current liabilities exceeded the current assets for both the group and the company as of 30 June 2025—S$84.8 million in liabilities for the group (up from S$16.8million in 2024), and S$45.7 million in liabilities for the company (down from S$81.4million in 2024).
