= Atticus Capital =

Former Wall Street hedge fund

Atticus Capital was a hedge fund. It was founded by Nathaniel Rothschild, 5th Baron Rothschild and Timothy Barakett in 1995.

== History ==
Atticus helped to stop the Deutsche Börse from taking over the London Stock Exchange.

Atticus was instrumental in the merger of Arcelor with Mittal Steel Company.

Atticus, from a minority shareholder position, prevented Phelps Dodge from merging with INCO Ltd in 2006 because it insisted on a share buy-back scheme rather than the merger investment.

In 2006, Atticus was rumoured to have $10 billion under administration.

Before it was wound down in 2010, Atticus was rumoured to have $20 billion under administration.

== Leadership ==
Timothy Barakett was CEO of Atticus for its 15 year lifetime.
