= Karawang International Industrial City =

Coordinates: 6.360°S 107.274°E

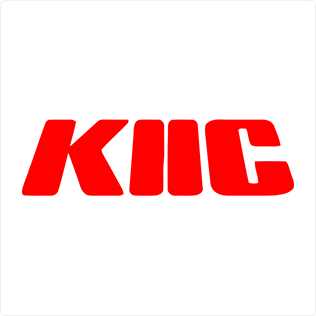
KIIC logo

Karawang International Industrial City (KIIC) is an industrial estate at Karawang Regency, West Java, which is located about 30 km south of Jakarta, Indonesia. It is a joint venture between Sinar Mas Land and ITOCHU Corporation of Japan. It has land area of about 1400 hectares and contains a various local and multinational corporations. KIIC is the first industrial estate in Indonesia to be granted ISO 9001:2000 certificate, ISO 14001:2004 for Quality & Environmental Management System in 2002 and OHSAS 18001:2007 certificate for Health & Safety Management Systems.

There are hotel, retail shops, restaurants, play grounds, banks, fire and gas stations within the development. The development has already turned into an automobile manufacturing hub in Indonesia. KIIC has direct access road to connect Jakarta-Cikampek Toll Road at KM 54 Karawang Timur Toll Gate.

== See also ==
- Karawang
- Sinar Mas Group
