= Asia Resource Minerals =

International mining group

Asia Resource Minerals plc
- Type: Public
- Traded as: LSE: ARMS
- Industry: Mining
- Founded: July 2010; 16 years ago
- Defunct: 14 November 2017
- Fate: Dissolved
- Headquarters: London, United Kingdom
- Key people: Samin Tan (chairman); Amir Sambodo (CEO); Halim Tan (CFO)
- Products: Metals, coal, iron ore
- Revenue: $1,425 million (2013)
- Operating income: $(23) million (2013)
- Net income: $(252) million (2013)
- Website: www.asiarmplc.com/

Asia Resource Minerals plc was a mining company listed on the London Stock Exchange. It was previously also known as Bumi Plc and Vallar plc, a SPAC sponsored by Nathaniel Rothschild.

== History ==
=== Vallar plc ===
In July 2010 Vallar plc, a Jersey-incorporated investment vehicle founded by Nathaniel Rothschild, raised £707.2 million ($1.07 billion) in an initial public offering on the London Stock Exchange. Together with other members of the Vallar management team, Rothschild invested £100 million in shares of the company. Vallar decided to focus on investments in the mining of metals, coal, and iron ore in the Americas, Russia, Eastern Europe, and Australia.

In November 2010, Vallar announced it was buying stakes in two listed Indonesian thermal coal (used for power stations) mining companies for a combination of $3bn in cash and new Vallar shares, with a view to combining them to create the largest exporter of thermal coal to China, India, and the other emerging economies of Asia; this was 25% of Bumi Resources (owned by the Bakrie family) and 75% of Berau Coal Energy. The transaction closed in April 2011.

=== Bumi Plc ===
In June 2011, Vallar agreed to execute a share swap arrangement with Bakrie & Brothers, the holding company of Bumi Resources. After this, Vallar's stakes in Bumi Resources and Berau increased to 29% and 85% respectively, while Bakrie & Brothers ended up with a 47% stake in Vallar. Vallar was also renamed to Bumi Plc.

In November 2011, the Bakrie group sold half of their stake in Bumi Plc to Samin Tan, the founder of Indonesian coking coal company Borneo Lumbung Energi & Metal, for $1 billion.

In September 2012, the company announced that it was looking into possible financial irregularities in its Indonesian operations resulting in a 14% fall in its share price. Its much-delayed financial results for 2012 showed a $200m black hole.

In January 2013, it was variously reported that $173 million had allegedly gone "missing" or that "mysteriously vanished" or that a withdrawal was "unauthorised" from Berau Coal Energy (a subsidiary of Bumi Plc) under Rosan Roeslani's leadership. Roeslani disputed the claims. The firm decided that if Roeslani repaid the money, no legal action would be taken. The Singapore arbitration court ruled in the company's favour against Roeslani on 30 December 2014.

=== Asia Resources Minerals ===
In March 2014, a complex restructuring deal saw the Bakries exit by selling their 23.8% stake (half of the original after the 2011 sell down) in Bumi Plc also to Samin Tan for $223 million while buying back their stake in Bumi Resources for $501 million. The company changed its name to Asia Resource Minerals.

Asia Resource Mineral's remaining asset at this point was its 84.7% holding in Berau Coal.

In June 2015, Rothschild (now controlling 17.2% of Asia Resource Minerals) accepted a takeover offer from Asia Coal Energy Ventures (a consortium led by Indonesia's Widjaya family, owners of the Sinar Mas conglomerate) for £23.2m, valuing the company at £134m. Fuganto Wijaja led this deal on behalf of Sinar Mas.
