= Fuganto Widjaja =

Indonesian businessman

- Born: 1980 or 1981 (age 44–45)
- Education: Cornell University; Cambridge Judge Business School
- Occupation: Businessman
- Title: CEO, Golden Energy and Resources
- Term: 2012-2016
- Relatives: Eka Tjipta Widjaja (grandfather); Oei Hong Leong (uncle)

Fuganto Widjaja (born 1980/1981) is an Indonesian billionaire businessman.

Fuganto Widjaja is the grandson of Eka Tjipta Widjaja, the founder of the Sinar Mas Group, an Indonesian palm oil and property conglomerate started before the Second World War. In April 2015, he revealed a surprise takeover bid for Asia Resource Minerals, the coal mining company founded by Nathaniel Rothschild.

== Early life and education ==
Widjaja attended high school in Singapore, before earning a bachelor's degree in Computer Science & Economics from Cornell University in 2003, and a master's degree in finance from the Cambridge Judge Business School in 2004.

== Career ==
After a stint at UBS, Widjaja founded Pristine Brand mineral water, before becoming a director of Sinar Mas Multiartha, holding company of Sinar Mas Financial services.

Fuganto Widjaja is Director at Sinar Mas Multihara TBK. He is also the Group Chief Executive Officer & Executive Director at Golden Energy & Resources Ltd (GEAR). GEAR is a subsidiary (formerly listed in Singapore) of the Sinar Mas Group focused on coal mining. Sinar Mas Group is active in six business pillars—Pulp & Paper, Agri-business & Food, Financial Services, Developer & Real Estate, Communications & Technology, and in Energy & Infrastructure.

An heir to the large family-owned conglomerate, Widjaja is on a mission to modernise the family business. He is shifting the business to focus on energy, infrastructure, telecommunications and education. As an entrepreneur, he believes in starting and creating new things that people need.

In April 2019, Widjaja launched Gear Innovation Network, a tech innovation centre by GEAR in Singapore. The centre was established with an initial investment of US$2 million and supported by the Economic Development Board in Singapore. Gear Innovation Network focuses on transforming capital-intensive industries such as mining, logistics and construction through digital technologies in Southeast Asia.

=== 2015 Asia Resources Minerals acquisition ===
In April 2015, he revealed a surprise takeover bid by Asia Coal Energy Ventures, a Sinar Mas subsidiary, for Asia Resource Minerals (founded by Nathaniel Rothschild), a company whose remaining principal asset was Berau Coal. This was a surprise takeover as past contenders had failed to secure a majority stake in the company. It was also viewed as a move that restored confidence in the Indonesian's ownership of a sizeable mining venture. Widjaja shared with the media that the investment was to support the Indonesian government's aim to boost electricity supply for the country through coal. Under Widjaja's leadership, Berau Coal received an award for its corporate social responsibility program at the 2019 ASEAN Coal Award. As part of this program, the company assisted the Punan Basap Tribe in a resettlement project. Widjaja also received an award as a TOP leader on CSR Community 2018. This is an award organised by TOP Business.

=== 2022 BHP's Australian coal mines acquisition ===
In 2022, GEAR completed the acquisition of an 80% stake in coal miner BHP Mitsui Coal (a subsidiary of BHP) for $1.2 billion. The remaining 20% stake in the joint venture is owned by Japanese conglomerate Mitsui. BHP Mitsui Coal has three coal mines located in Bowen Basin, Queensland, Australia with combined marketable metallurgical coal reserves of 180 million metric tonnes and revenue of $989 million in 2021.

The Russia-Ukraine crisis that has disrupted supply chains, counter-party risk due to sanctions as well as rising prices throughout Asian markets has caused Newcastle physical prices to reach $400 per tonne while Metallurgical and PCI (pulverised coal injection) prices also skyrocketed nearing $400 per tonne respectively.
