= Eka Tjipta Widjaja =

Indonesian businessman (died 2019)

- 黃奕聰
- Born: 27 February 1921; Quanzhou, Fujian, China
- Died: 26 January 2019 (aged 97); Jakarta, Indonesia
- Citizenship: Indonesian
- Spouses: Trinidewi Lasuki (died 2017); Mellie Pirieh Widjaja (died 2009); others
- Children: 19, including Oei Hong Leong, Teguh Ganda Widjaja, Indra Widjaja, Muktar Widjaja, Frankle Djafar Widjaja, Franky Oesman Widjaja, and Sukmawati Widjaja
- Relatives: Fuganto Widjaja (grandson), Jackson Widjaja (grandson), Michael Widjaja (grandson), Linda Suryasari Wijaya Limantara (granddaughter), Jesslyne Widjaja (granddaughter)

Chinese name
- Traditional Chinese: 黃奕聰
- Simplified Chinese: 黄奕聪
- Hanyu Pinyin: Huáng Yìcōng
- Hokkien POJ: Ûiⁿ E̍k Chhong

Eka Tjipta Widjaja or Eka Tjipta Widjaya (Indonesian pronunciation: [ˌeka ˌtʃip̚t̪a wiˈdʒaja]), born Oei Ek Tjong (Chinese: 黃奕聰; pinyin: Huáng Yìcōng; Pe̍h-ōe-jī: Ûiⁿ E̍k Chhong), was an Indonesian businessman who founded the Sinar Mas Group, one of the largest conglomerates in Indonesia. After immigrating to Indonesia with his family when he was a child, Widjaja became a member of the PCC, traded copra in the mid-1950s, moved into the palm oil industry soon after, started a paper factory in the 1970s, and then entered financial services in the 1980s. At the time of his death, Sinar Mas had interests in paper, real estate, financial services, agribusiness, and telecom with holdings primarily in Indonesia, Singapore, Malaysia, and China, and Widjaja was listed by Forbes as the third-richest person in Indonesia with an estimated net worth of US$8.6 billion.

== Early life ==
Widjaja was born Oei Ek Tjhong (c. 1921 (Note: Several sources disagree on his exact birthdate or birthyear.)–2019, born in Quanzhou, China as Oei Ėk-Tjhong) He was the son of a Celebes-based trader. Around 1930, he and his mother moved to Indonesia–then the Dutch East Indies–to join his father who had already settled in the city of Makassar, and he started helping his father to run a small shop. He was educated in a local Chinese school but left at the age of fifteen to work as a hawker. As a teenager, he sold biscuits and candy from his bicycle.

== Career ==
In his early career, Widjaja did various business, including trading cooking oil and agricultural products, coffee shop, pig rearing, bakery, and grave construction. During Japanese occupation, price controls devastated his cooking oil business. When Indonesia's war for independence against the Dutch crushed his commodity-trading business in 1949, he sold family jewelry to repay creditors and traded in his car for a bicycle.

In the 1950s, when Indonesian military sent troops to Makassar to fight Andi Aziz in the Makassar Uprising and later Abdul Kahar Muzakkar in the Darul Islam Rebellion, Widjaja sold food and other supplies to the troops, forging ties between him and the military. He used the military ship to trade copra—the raw material to make coconut oil—from Manado to Makassar. And thus, his copra business started, later reaching Jakarta and Surabaya. However, the Permesta rebellion happened in Sulawesi and Widjaja decided to move to Surabaya.

In 1962, CV Sinar Mas was first registered in Surabaya, and soon it opened a branch office in Jakarta. This company exported natural products and imported textiles.

In 1968, Widjaja opened a cooking oil factory PT Bitung Manado Oil in Manado, followed by PT Kunci Mas in Surabaya. The Manado-based factory later produced cooking oil under the brand Bimoli, which catered to up to 50 percent of the demand in the Indonesian cooking oil market. In 1990, Widjaja lost this brand to Salim Group after their joint ventures in cooking oil business split.

In 1972, together with Taiwanese investors, Widjaja acquired caustic soda producer Tjiwi Kimia, which he transformed into the Sinar Mas Group's first pulp and paper manufacturer. In the same year, he started Duta Pertiwi, a property developer and real estate business. In the 1970s, he already acquired logging concessions.

In 1980, Sinar Mas changed all its cooking oil refinery machines to be able to produce palm oil. In the same year, Widjaja already possessed extensive oil palm fields in Sumatra, Kalimantan, Sulawesi, and Papua. In 1982, he acquired a 10,000-hectare (39 sq mi) field in North Sumatra.

Also in 1982, Widjaja acquired Bank Internasional Indonesia (BII) and founded PT Internas Artha Leasing Company. BII became the second largest private bank in Indonesia, but due to the 1997 Asian financial crisis, it failed in April 1998 with a debt of US$4.6 billion (the largest foreign debt owed by an Indonesian corporation at that time) and was nationalized in April 1999. Widjaja moved back into banking by acquiring PT Bank Shinta Indonesia in 2005 and later renamed it as PT Bank Sinarmas.

In 1990, Widjaja received an honorary doctorate from Pittsburg State University in Pittsburg, Kansas, United States.

By the mid-1990s, Widjaja's best-known asset was a controlling stake in Asia Pulp & Paper (APP), a Singapore-based company listed on the New York Stock Exchange and the 10th-largest paper company in the world. After the 1997 Asian financial crisis and a dip in the international wood pulp price in 2000, it was revealed that the company had a global US$13.9 billion debt. In March 2001, two months after being threatened with delisting from the NYSE, APP stopped paying its debt, considered to be the largest debt default in the world's emerging markets. APP has also been convicted of being involved in illegal logging in Cambodia, Yunnan Province, China, destroying ancient rainforest and the illegal felling of over 50 thousand acres (200 km^{2}) of forest in Bukit Tigapuluh national park.

As of 2003, Widjaja lived primarily in Singapore and had turned over day-to-day control of his businesses to his extensive family.

== Personal life and family ==
Unlike many other Chinese-Indonesian tycoons, Widjaja was known to flaunt his wealth. He rode in fancy cars and wore a belt buckle encrusted with diamonds spelling out his name, "EKA".

Widjaja had several wives and at least 40 children.

His first wife was Trinidewi (or Trini Dewi) Lasuki, who died in 2017. Eka reportedly treated the children of his first wife as his heirs, while providing financial support to his other children to help start businesses. Most of Eka's children by Trinidewi — six males and two females — are involved in the family businesses. The eldest daughter, Sukmawati Widjaja (Oei Siu Hoa), serves as Sinar Mas vice chairperson since 1988. Sukmawati was previously married to her cousin, Rudy Maeloa, who was Eka's right hand who died in 1988.

Eka's eldest son, Teguh Ganda Widjaja (Oei Tjie Goan), heads the pulp and paper division of the group as the chairman of Asia Pulp & Paper. Teguh's son, Jackson Widjaja, is the CEO of Paper Excellence, Catalyst Paper, Domtar and Resolute Forest Products. These companies' pulp and paper capacity will be more than 11 million tons per year after the acquisition of Resolute. Teguh's brothers are or were in charge of other divisions; Eka's third son, Indra Widjaja (Oei Pheng Lian or Oei Beng Nien), of financial services; the fourth son, Muktar Widjaja (Oei Siong Lian), of property; and the youngest sixth son, Franky Oesman Widjaja (Oei Jong Nian), of agribusiness (he is the chairman of Golden Agri-Resources).

Indra Widjaja's son, Fuganto Widjaja, heads coal mining and trading company Golden Energy and Resources, Sinar Mas' Singapore-based subsidiary, and is considered as the group's new face, proclaimed to shift its focus to energy and infrastructure, telecoms, healthcare, and education.

Some of Eka's other wives and their children have been given their own business groups to manage. His seven children by one wife—Mellie Pirieh, who died in 2009—run the Duta Dharma Bhakti group of 26 companies. A son from another marriage, Oei Hong Leong, is ranked by Forbes in 2018 as the 22nd richest person in Singapore, with a net worth of US$1.5 billion.

After Widjaja's death, his family continues to have a net worth of $9.7 billion and is ranked second on the list of Indonesia's 50 Richest List as of December 2021.

== Death ==
Widjaja died on 26 January 2019, at his home in Menteng, Jakarta. He was buried on 2 February 2019, in the family cemetery in Karawang, West Java. After his death, there have been news on family disputes regarding his will(s).

== See also ==
- Sudono Salim, a Chinese-Indonesian tycoon
- Sinar Mas Group
