= Darussalam Grand Mosque, Palangka Raya =

Mosque in Central Kalimantan, Indonesia

Darussalam Grand Mosque
- Masjid Raya Darussalam

- Location of Darussalam Grand Mosque, Palangka Raya in Central Kalimantan Darussalam Grand Mosque, Palangka Raya (Kalimantan)

Religion
- Affiliation: Islam
- Branch/tradition: Sunni

Location
- Location: Palangka Raya, Central Kalimantan, Indonesia
- Interactive map of Darussalam Grand Mosque
- Coordinates: 2°13′51″S 113°53′24″E

Architecture
- Type: Mosque
- Style: Mix of Postmodernism, Arabic, and local Dayak architecture
- Established: 1984 (renovated in 2011)

Specifications
- Capacity: 10,000 to 20,000 people
- Dome: 5
- Minaret: 1
- Minaret height: 114 metres (374 ft)

Darussalam Grand Mosque, Palangka Raya is one of the mosques in Central Kalimantan, Indonesia. This grand mosque is located on George Obos Street in the district of Jekan Raya, Palangka Raya. This mosque is situated within the Islamic Center area of Palangka Raya. This grand mosque is also one of the most important icons of the capital city of Central Kalimantan province.

== History ==
This grand mosque was built in 1984 initiated by the Foundation of Amal Bakti Muslim Pancasila with its traditional roof shape of three layers of four-sided pyramids. Later on 2010, the provincial government of Central Kalimantan intended to build a mosque which would be the grand mosque of the City of Palangka Raya. Therefore, The Darussalam Grand Mosque was renovated in 2011. The renovation process took three years to be complete. Until 2014, the renovation has completed and this mosque was inaugurated by the governor of Central Kalimantan at that time, Mr. Agustin Teras Narang.

== Architecture ==
The building area of Darussalam Grand Mosque is 40,000 square metres (430,000 sq ft). This grand mosque can host more 10,000 worshipers in the 2,028 square metres (21,830 sq ft) prayer area. The architecture of this grand mosque is a mix between postmodernism, Arabic, and local Dayak architecture. The trace of traditional Dayak architecture could be seen from the traditional Dayak-carved shield as the exterior design of the building. Moreover, the traditional Dayak architecture trace could also be seen from the color patterns on the domes of the mosque. This grand mosque has five domes consisted of one main 32-m diameter dome and four secondary domes. To the southwest of the mosque, there is one tall minaret which has 114 meters in height. This grand mosque has also three different floors, the first one which functioned as the management office of the grand mosque and the second & the third floors which functioned as the main prayer area.

== Gallery ==
The front look of Darussalam Grand Mosque

The side look of Darussalam Grand Mosque

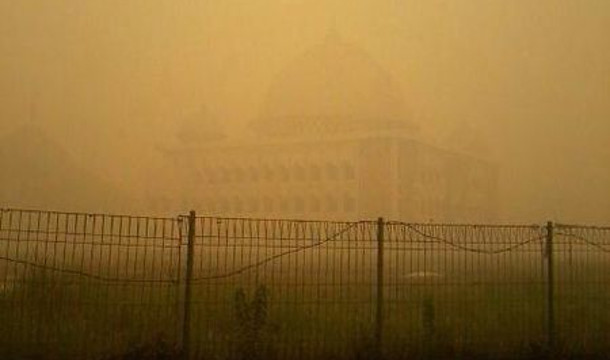
Darussalam Grand Mosque of Palangka Raya in 2015 catastrophic haze
