= 2015 Voluntary non-work day =

Internet hoax in Singapore

In Singapore, rumours that the Ministry of Manpower had declared a voluntary non-work day appeared on the evening of 24 September 2015 as the Pollutant Standards Index (PSI) was 313-341 in the Hazardous range between 7pm and 5am. The Ministry of Manpower lodged a police report over a hoax post on social media (WhatsApp or Facebook) that claimed it had declared a "voluntary non-work day" on 25 September 2015 as a result of the haze.

== See also ==
- Fake blog
- Confidence trick
- Emulex hoax
