= Oei Hong Leong =

Sinaporean businessman (born 1941)

- Born: 21 March 1948
- Other name: Peter Oei
- Citizenship: Singaporean
- Occupations: Businessman, real estate developer
- Children: 4
- Parent: Eka Tjipta Widjaja
- Relatives: Fuganto Widjaja (nephew)

Oei Hong Leong (born 21 March 1948), also known as Peter Oei, is a Singaporean billionaire businessman.

== Early life ==
Oei Hong Leong is a son of Indonesian Eka Tjipta Widjaja, who died in 2019. He was educated in China, having moved there as a teenager, and lived there in the 1960s and 1970s.

== Career ==
According to Forbes, "the bulk of his wealth is derived from a corporate bond portfolio and real estate assets".

Oei owns "prime property" in Vancouver, Canada, including the waterfront Plaza of Nations site, that he bought from Li Ka-shing in 1989 for CAN$40 million. The site has been renamed Expo Gardens and there are plans to build 1.4 million sq ft of residential property and 700,000 sq ft of commercial and retail property. It was reported in The Vancouver Sun, Jan 2025, that the waterfront property in Vancouver was sold for hundreds of millions of dollars to minority partners based in Hong Kong.

In 2017, he founded One Belt One Net, a data centre company in Singapore, with a SIN$6.7 billion investment.

Oei is the chairman of Chip Lian Investments, the Oei Hong Leong Foundation, and the Nei Xue Tang Museum.

== Personal life ==
Oei is married, with four children, and lives in Singapore. He collects Buddhist art, and owns the private Nei Xue Tang Museum in Singapore, which has more than 50,000 pieces.
