= Asia Pulp & Paper =

Indonesian pulp and paper company

- Type: Private
- Industry: Pulp and paper
- Founder: Eka Tjipta Widjaja, Singgih Wahab Kwik (Kowik)
- Area served: Worldwide
- Products: Packaging, paper, tissue
- Parent: Sinar Mas Group
- Website: app.co.id

Asia Pulp & Paper (APP) is an Indonesian pulp and paper company based in Jakarta, Indonesia. One of the largest pulp and paper companies in the world, it was founded as Tjiwi Kimia by Eka Tjipta Widjaja in 1972. Asia Pulp & Paper is a subsidiary of Sinar Mas Group and was officially formed in 1994 when Sinar combined its paper and pulp operations from Tjiwi Kimia and PT Inda Kiat Pulp & Paper.

== History ==
Asia Pulp & Paper was founded as Tjiwi Kimia by Eka Tjipta Widjaja who at the time was a refiner of coconut oil. In 1972 he started Pabrik Kertas Tjiwi Kimia along with Taiwanese investors with the purpose of making paper. Widjaja was already operating what became known as Sinar Mas Group, and started Tjiwi Kimia based on his success in commodities.

In December 1976, Indah Kiat was formed as a joint venture between CV Berkat (an Indonesian company), Chung Hwa Pulp Corporation, and Yuen Foong Yu Paper Manufacturing Company. Sinar Mas acquired 67 per cent of the venture's total shares. Tjiwi Kimia was listed on the Jakarta and Surabaya Stock Exchanges beginning in 1990. In 1992, Tjiwi Kimia began establishing paper industries in Yangtze and Pearl Delta in China, leading to paper mills Ningbo Zhonghua, Goldeast Paper, Ningbo Asia, Gold Huasheng, Gold Hongye, Hainan Jinhai Pulp and Paper, and Guangxi Jingui Pulp & Paper.

In 1994, Sinar Mas incorporated Asia Pulp & Paper in Singapore, consolidated its pulp and paper operations in Indonesia by combing operations from Tjiwi Kimia and PT Inda Kiat Pulp & Paper. The following year it was listed on the New York Stock Exchange. It began investing capital to become an industry leader in paper and pulp, spending $4.7 billion on capital investments in 1996 and 1997. By 1999, its total paper and packaging production was more than four million metric tonnes per year.

During the Asian Debt Crises in 2001, APP defaulted on $12 billion of debt. In November 2003, Jakarta-based subsidiary Indah Kiat sued the underwriter and holders of an issue of debt (in United States dollars) it had issued in 1994 under New York law; it sued, however, in Indonesia, and in February 2007 the Indonesian court declared the debt invalid.

Asia Pulp & Paper moved its headquarters back to Indonesia and eventually spun off APP China in a debt-for-equity swap. It agreed to repayment of $7 billion in debt over the next 10 years, covering the debts of its Indonesia subsidiaries. By 2010, Asia Pulp & Paper was operating five of the top paper mill companies in Indonesia, including Indah Kiat, Lontar Papyrus, Pindo Deli, Tjiwi Kimia, and Ekamas Fortuna. Its principal operations were in Indonesia and China with Indonesia producing 13 million tonnes of paper and China producing 6.4 million tons on an annual basis. The same year it hired former Greenpeace activist Patrick Moore who authored a report that describes APP as not responsible for deforestation in Indonesia.

== Operations ==
=== Activist criticism ===
Asia Pulp & Paper has been the focus of campaigns by groups like Greenpeace and Rainforest Action Network, including accusations by Greenpeace of logging natural forests.

Asia Pulp & Paper has entered into agreements with NGOs for monitoring of its sustainability practices. As a result of the announcement of APP's zero deforestation plan, Greenpeace, Rainforest Action Network and other NGOs welcomed the company's Forest Conservation Policy while expressing cautious optimism. Greenpeace also agreed to halt its global campaign against APP and open discussions to ensure that the company properly implements its policy.

In 2003, APP signed a Memorandum of Understanding with the World Wildlife Fund. This ended six months later based on WWF refusing to approve the environmental management plan. APP entered into a five-year partnership with Rainforest Alliance in 2005 to identify and monitoring high conservation areas. The agreement was terminated in 2007, but Rainforest Alliance re-engaged with APP in 2014 to evaluate the progress of its conservation policy. In September 2015, the Singaporean National Environment Agency (NEA) named APP as one of five companies possibly responsible for the 2015 Southeast Asian Haze. The Singapore Environment Council instituted a temporary restriction on the use of Singapore Green label certifications for APP products in response, causing companies such as NTUC FairPrice to pull products sourced by APP. In response, APP implemented better fire suppression strategies, by investing US$100 million in an Integrated Fire Management System which claimed to reduce forest fires since 2015 and later received the Singapore Environment Council's (SEC) enhanced Green Label certification after SEC audits of its suppliers, allowing its products to return to Singapore shelves.

=== Sustainability ===
In 2012, APP announced its Sustainability Roadmap Vision 2020 plan. The company pledged to be wholly reliant on raw materials from plantations and have all its suppliers operate by High Conservation Value Forest (HCVF) standards by 2015, using independent audits to track progress. By 2012, all of APP's Indonesian mills had received SVLK timber legality certification, which is the Indonesian Timber Legality Assurance System, designed to ensure the mills only receive and process timber from legal sources, and that all products exported from the country are traceable to verifiable points of origin. Following such, APP was authorized by the European Commission to import fiber products.

By February 2013, APP had halted the clearing of natural forests across its supply chain. The same year it worked with The Forest Trust and Greenpeace to design its Forest Conservation Policy and to monitor and report on the company's progress towards achieving its commitments. In addition, APP's policy specifically welcomes third party observers to verify the implementation – a first for APP and the industry. It also began identifying natural forests through High Conservation Value (HCV) and High Carbon Stock (HCS) assessments across all APP land concessions in Indonesia, and launched a pilot online monitoring dashboard, which provides access to updated technical information.

In 2014, APP coordinated with the government of Indonesia and NGOs, implementing a plan to restore and support conservation of 2.5 million acres of rain forest in Indonesia. In 2015, APP received PEFC certification.

=== Conservation ===
In 2010, APP created Senepis Buluhala Tiger Sanctuary, a 106,000-hectare sanctuary to help conserve the endangered Sumatran tiger.

APP continues construction and logging in Sumatra's Kampar peninsula. In February 2013, APP committed to improving forest conservation, which it dubbed its Forest Conservation Policy. However, from 2013 to the present, APP also planned and/or implemented several major expansions to increase production capacity. Because overcapacity has been linked to negative environmental and social impacts, APP partners raised concerns that the commitments outlined in the Forest Conservation Policy could not be met.

In response to these concerns, APP commissioned an independent study to analyze whether it would be able to meet its commitments. According to APP, the September 2014 unpublished results from The Growth & Yield – Wood Supply Study "confirmed that Asia Pulp and Paper Group (APP) has sufficient plantation resources to meet the pulp requirements of its existing mills as well as its future mill in OKI, South Sumatra". However, since the results were never published it is not possible to verify the results of the study, nor can the claim of independence be verified.
