= Sinar Mas =

Indonesian conglomerate holding company

- Formerly: Sinar Mas Group (1938-2006)
- Type: Private
- Industry: Conglomerate
- Founder: Eka Tjipta Widjaja
- Headquarters: Jakarta, Indonesia
- Website: www.sinarmas.com/en/

Sinar Mas is one of the largest conglomerates in Indonesia. It was formed in 1938. It has numerous subsidiaries, including Asia Pulp & Paper and palm oil producer PT SMART. The company also acquired Berau Coal Energy from Asia Resource Minerals PLC, a major mining group founded by Nathaniel Rothschild, in a takeover initiated by Fuganto Widjaja.

Sinar Mas was founded by a Chinese Indonesian tycoon, Eka Tjipta Widjaja.

Sinar Mas businesses operate in different sectors such as pulp & paper, real estate, financial services, agribusiness, telecommunications, and mining. The businesses are listed in the Indonesian and Singapore stock exchanges.

== History ==
In its early days, Sinar Mas was first started as a small grocery shop in 1938 in Makassar, Dutch East Indies by Eka Tjipta Widjaja. After the end of the Indonesian national revolution, Eka started to expand his business into copra, palm oil, and paper production. After the failure of his copra business, Eka later established CV Sinar Mas in Surabaya and established a cooking oil factory along with a paper mill in the city.

In 2010, Smartfren was founded as a result of a merger with a telecommunications provider, Fren.

Since 2003, Sinar Mas no longer calls itself the Sinar Mas Group because after restructuring Sinar Mas no longer has a holding company, but rather a President's office that facilitates/assist in implementing its business pillars.

== Business units ==
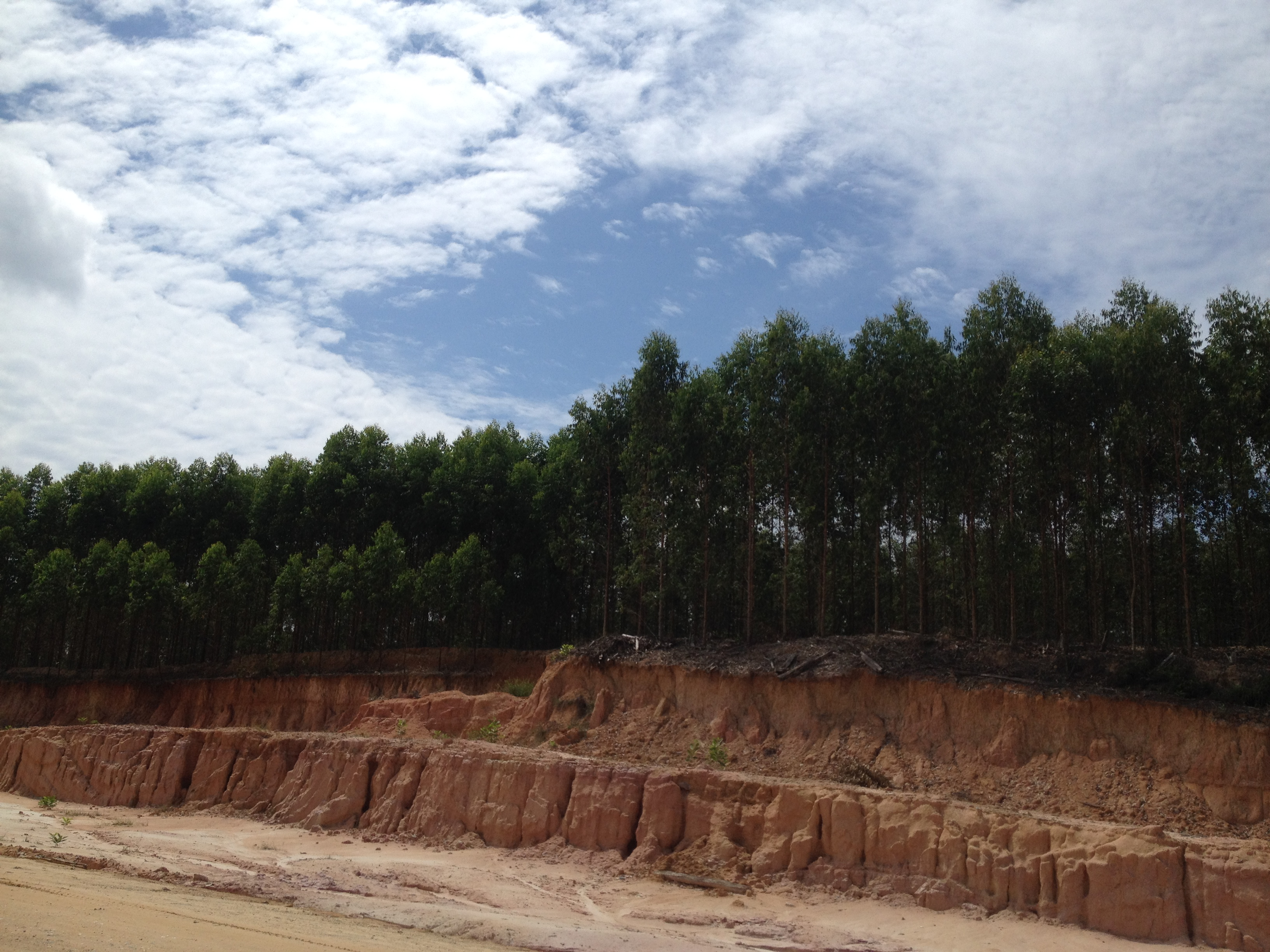
Hutan Tanam Industri Bengkalis, an industrial forest plantation developed by PT Arara Abadi, a Sinar Mas company, in Bengkalis Regency

- PT Innovate Mas Indonesia
- PT Mora Quatro Multimedia (CEPAT NET, HOMELinks)
- PT Sinar Mas Komunikasi Teknologi (Sinar Mas Communication & Technology)
  - PT XLSmart Telecom Sejahtera Tbk (XLSmart) – 34.8%
  - PT Ahamobi Telecom (AhaMobi)
- PT The Univenus
- PT Sinar Dunia Makmur (Sinar Dunia)
  - PT Indah Kiat Pulp & Paper Tbk (Asia Pulp & Paper)
  - PT Indah Kiat Pulp & Paper Industries Tbk
  - PT Pabrik Kertas Tjiwi Kimia Tbk
  - PT Pindo Deli Pulp and Paper Mills
  - PT Lontar Papyrus Pulp & Paper Industry
  - PT Ekamas Fortuna
  - PT Purinusa Ekapersada
- PT Sinar Mas Agro Resources and Technology Tbk
- PT Sinar Mas Multiartha Tbk (Sinar Mas Multiartha)
  - PT Bank Sinarmas Tbk (Sinarmas Bank)
  - PT Bank Nano Syariah (Nanobank Syariah) – digital Islamic bank established through the spin-off of Bank Sinarmas's Sharia business unit, officially launched 18 January 2024, making it Indonesia's first bank established through such a spin-off process.
  - PT Simas Money Changer
  - PT Asuransi Jiwa Sinarmas MSIG
  - PT Arthamas Konsulindo
  - PT Sinarartha Konsulindo
  - PT Asuransi Sinar Mas (Sinar Mas Insurance)
  - PT KB Insurance Indonesia
  - PT Asuransi Summit Otto
  - PT Sinar Mas Multifinance
  - PT AB Sinar Mas Multifinance
  - PT Sinartama Gunita
  - PT Sinarmas Sekuritas
  - SimInvest – digital investment platform for stocks and mutual funds operated by Sinarmas Sekuritas
  - PT Sinarmas Aset Management
  - PT Sinarmas Futures
  - PT Komunindo Arga Digital
  - PT Arthamas Informatika
  - PT Arthamas Solusindo
  - PT Sinar Artha Inforindo
  - PT Sinar Artha Solusindo
  - PT Super Wahana Tehno
  - PT Panji Ratu Jakarta
  - PT Wapindo Jasaartha
  - PT Balai Lelang Sinarmas
  - PT Artha Bina Usaha
  - PT Sinarmas LDA Maritime
  - PT Sinar Artha Trading
  - PT Autopro Utama Perkasa
- Sinar Mas Land
  - BSD City
  - BSD Techno Park
  - Kota Deltamas
  - Greenland International Industrial City
  - Karawang International Industrial City
  - Orchard Towers
  - Damai Indah Golf
  - Le Grandeur Jakarta
  - Le Grandeur Balikpapan
  - Eka Hospital
- PT Dian Swastatika Sentosa Tbk
- PT Golden Energy Mines Tbk (Sinar Mas Mining)
- Eka Tjipta Foundation

== Criticism and controversies ==
=== Defaults ===
==== Asia Pulp & Paper ====
In 2001, Asia Pulp & Paper (APP), the subsidiary of Sinar Mas, called a standstill on $14 billion worth of bonds and loans and stopped repaying its debt, including interest payments, in what is still the largest default to foreign investors in Asian market history. On August 15, 2018, the Anti Forest Mafia Coalition, published a report revealing that two APP suppliers in East Kalimantan had cleared nearly 32,000 hectares of natural forest, in violation of APP’s no-deforestation commitment in February 2013. Prior to this, APP and its pulpwood suppliers had a history of almost 30 years of deforestation and related destruction in the region. APP has hence remained one of only three companies in the world that the Forest Stewardship Council has disassociated from since October 2007. On September 7, 2018, the World Wide Fund for Nature (WWF) openly recommended that companies and financial investors end their business relationships with APP and its affiliates.

==== Berau Coal ====
In 2015, Berau Capital Resources Pte Ltd (Singapore) issued US$450 million worth of 12.5% guaranteed senior secured notes. In 2017, PT Berau Coal Energy (Indonesia) also issued US$500 million worth of 7.25% guaranteed senior notes. Both the 2015 and 2017 notes went into default. As of July 2015, the Berau Group brought 4 separate rounds of scheme of arrangement / moratorium proceedings, with terms which have been described as “frankly insulting” at a time when global coal prices had doubled. None of the schemes has succeeded.

=== Environmental concerns ===
Smart Tbk, the palm-oil producing subsidiary of Sinarmas Group, has been accused by Greenpeace of causing deforestation of Indonesian rainforests. To investigate this accusation, Smart Tbk has appointed Control Union Certification and BSI Group, assisted by two researchers from the Bogor Agricultural Institute.

=== Haze in Singapore and Malaysia ===
Sinar Mas is one of the eight companies responsible for sending hazardous level of smog to Singapore and Malaysia. Yet, company said forest fires within concession areas did not mean that it was the company that had started the fire. Sinar Mas had not been involved in any deforestation since 2013 and has had zero burning policy since 1997.

In October 2026, Singapore's National Environment Agency issued three of its subsidiaries legal notices for information relating to their involvement in the 2026 Southeast Asian Haze.

=== Unilever ===
In December 2009, Unilever suspended purchases of palm oil from Smart Tbk, citing concerns that Smart Tbk had not provided sufficient evidence that they are not involved in unacceptable environmental practices. However, Unilever plan to resume Palm Oil purchases if independent auditors, formed by Sinar Mas and Unilever, disprove allegations of forest destruction.

=== Nestlé ===
In March 2010, Nestlé faced a public reputation crisis over its procurement of palm oil from Sinar Mas whose plantations are reported to be the cause of widespread rainforest and orangutan habitat destruction. To avert the public reputation disaster, Nestlé quickly moved to stop its palm oil procurement from Sinar Mas. After Sinar Mas appointed independent auditors to investigate the issue, Nestlé joined the committee and may resume palm oil procurement from Sinar Mas if they are cleared of the allegations. In August 2010 the Nestlé chairman Peter Brabeck-Letmathe stated that the focus on his company is misguided. "You know very well that it's not Nestle's 350,000 tons of palm oil that brought about deforestation in Indonesia", he said, "but a political decision to use food as a source for biofuels." The United Kingdom and Germany alone have consumed 500,000 tons of palm oil for biofuels between them, he said.

=== Abengoa ===
In May 2010, Abengoa Bioenergy asked its raw material suppliers to boycott palm oil from any company in the Indonesian group of Sinar Mas, until it can demonstrate that it fully complies with Abengoa’s environmental and social sustainability policy.

=== HSBC ===
In May 2010, focus of the Greenpeace campaign moved to HSBC, calling for them to sell their stocks in Sinar Mas. HSBC had admitted it held shares in Golden Agri-Resources Ltd, the palm oil arm of the Sinar Mas Group, via asset management funds including its Climate Change Fund. Although according to the bank's ethical forestry policy, the bank would not finance plantations converted from natural forest since June 2004, the rule then did not apply to its asset management funds.

By July 2010, HSBC had written to Greenpeace to inform them that the shares had been sold.

=== Carrefour ===
In July 2010, Carrefour has dropped Sinar Mas as its supplier. “Carrefour is committed to sustainable development and has decided to cease sourcing of APP supplies for private label products from mid-year this year until further notice.” Carrefour Indonesia external communication manager Hendri Satrio told The Jakarta Post in a letter.

=== Burger King ===
In September 2010, Burger King announced that they would no longer source Palm Oil from Sinar Mas. They published a statement announcing: "After completing a thorough review of the independent verification report conducted by Control Union Certification (CUC) and BSI Group, we believe the report has raised valid concerns about some of the sustainability practices of Sinar Mas' palm oil production and its impact on the rainforest. These practices are inconsistent with our corporate responsibility commitments"

=== Mattel ===
On 7 June 2011, Greenpeace launched "Barbie, It's Over", a global campaign to bring awareness and encourage Mattel to switch pulp and paper producers. Mattel uses paper sourced from Asia Pulp & Paper, one of the subsidiaries of Sinar Mas Group in its product packaging, particularly in packaging in the Barbie line of toys.

== Exhibition and convention center ==
Together with Kompas Gramedia Group, Sinar Mas Land has built ICE on 22 hectares (54 acres) of land in Bumi Serpong Damai, which is the largest convention and exhibition centre in Indonesia. The ICE, started in 2012 and completed in 2016, equipped with 10 exhibition halls, a convention center, and a 300-room hotel on site. The center will be able to accommodate at least 200,000 visitors a day and 10,000-capacity concert hall .

== Philanthropy ==
Recently the company has created Eka Tjipta Foundation, a philanthropic foundation that focuses on Education, Poverty and Renewable Energy. Jaya Suprana from the Indonesian Museum of Records (MURI) presented a certificate to the Eka Tjipta Foundation, a non-profit organization under one of the country’s largest conglomerates, Sinar Mas, for granting “the largest number of scholarships for undergraduate students during certain period".

== Sponsorships ==
The Sinar Mas Group has been the jersey sponsor of the Indonesian national basketball team since 2021.
