= Lady Rothschild =

Lady Rothschild may refer to:

- Emma Louise von Rothschild (1844–1935), wife of Nathan Rothschild, 1st Baron Rothschild
- Barbara Judith Hutchinson (1911–1989), first wife of Victor Rothschild, 3rd Baron Rothschild, between 1933 and 1946
- Teresa Rothschild (née Mayor) (1915–1996), second wife of Victor Rothschild, 3rd Baron Rothschild
- Serena Rothschild (née Dunn) (1935–2019), wife of Jacob Rothschild, 4th Baron Rothschild
- Loretta Rothschild (née Basey) (born 1990), wife of Nathaniel Rothschild, 5th Baron Rothschild

== See also ==
- Baron Rothschild
