= James Rothschild =

British financier (born 1985)

- Born: 14 May 1985 (age 41); London, England
- Occupation: Financier
- Spouse: Nicky Hilton (m. 2015)
- Children: 3
- Father: Amschel Rothschild
- Relatives: Jacob Rothschild, 4th Baron Rothschild (paternal half-uncle); Emma Rothschild (paternal aunt); Hugo Guinness (maternal uncle); Sabrina Guinness (maternal aunt); Julia Samuel (maternal aunt)
- Family: Rothschild banking family of England (paternal); Guinness family (maternal); Hilton family (by marriage)

James Amschel Victor Rothschild (born 14 May 1985) is a British financier and a member of the Rothschild banking family of England and the Guinness family. In 2015, he married Nicky Hilton, an American socialite, fashion designer, and model.

== Family background and early life ==
James Amschel Victor Rothschild was born in Westminster, London, England, on 14 May 1985, as the youngest child and only son to Amschel Mayor James Rothschild, a British businessman who was a member of the Rothschild banking family of England, and his wife, Anita Patience (née Guinness), a British socialite who is a member of the "banking line" of the Guinness family, founders of Guinness Mahon in 1836, which descends from Samuel Guinness (1727–1795), the brother of Arthur Guinness. Rothschild's paternal grandparents were Victor Rothschild, 3rd Baron Rothschild, a British businessman and politician, and his second wife, Teresa Rothschild, Baroness Rothschild (née Mayor), a British counter-intelligence officer and magistrate. His maternal grandparents were James Edward Alexander Rundell Guinness, a British investment banker, and his wife, Pauline Vivien (née Mander), a British housewife. He has two sisters, Kate Emma Rothschild, a music promoter, and Alice Miranda Rothschild Goldsmith, a company director. Rothschild's sisters both married into the Goldsmith family. They married brothers; sons of the French-British billionaire financier and politician Sir James Goldsmith and his third wife, Lady Annabel Goldsmith (née Vane-Tempest-Stewart), an English socialite. In September 2003, his elder sister, Kate, married the English financier and environmentalist Ben Goldsmith; they have three children together and divorced in April 2013, after less than ten years of marriage. In March 2013, his younger sister, Alice, married the British politician and journalist Zac Goldsmith; they have three children together and announced their separation in March 2023, after ten years of marriage. His paternal aunt and uncle were Jacob Rothschild, 4th Baron Rothschild and Emma Rothschild. His maternal aunts and uncle are the artist and writer Hugo Guinness; socialite Sabrina Guinness; and philanthropist Julia Samuel, a godmother to Prince George of Wales. He is a half first cousin of Hannah Rothschild, and Nathaniel Rothschild, 5th Baron Rothschild. His godfather is William Waldegrave, Baron Waldegrave of North Hill.

Rothschild was eleven years old when his father died by suicide at the Hôtel Le Bristol Paris. When he was seventeen, his mother married James Adair Wigan, a bloodstock agent, who is now his stepfather.

== Career ==
Rothschild began his career as an investment banking professional at N M Rothschild & Sons Limited. He has previously served as an Analyst at JNR UK Ltd. He served as an Analyst at Hargreave Hale Limited from 2005 to 2006.

Since 2010, Rothschild has served as a Partner and Vice President at Monument Capital Group Holdings LLC. He is the founder and Chief Executive Officer of JR Capital Ltd. and was a co-founder of West Arrow, an investment and advisory firm.

He is also a co-founder and Managing Partner of Tru Arrow Partners, an investment firm focused on growth technology. Through its funds, the firm has invested in Groq, Figma, and Dream Security.

== Personal life ==
Rothschild attended Eton College and the University of London.

He began dating Nicholai Olivia "Nicky" Hilton, an American socialite, fashion designer and model who is a member of the Hilton family,—the younger daughter of Richard Hilton and Kathy Hilton—in 2011, having met at Petra Ecclestone and James Stunt's wedding in Italy. On 12 August 2014, he became engaged to Hilton. The couple were married in the Orangery at Kensington Palace in London on 10 July 2015. His sister-in law is the American media personality Paris Hilton.

Rothschild and Hilton have three children together, two girls and a boy;

- Lily-Grace Victoria Rothschild (born 8 July 2016).
- Theodora Marilyn Rothschild (born 20 December 2017), known as Teddy.
- Chasen Rothschild (born June 2022).

Rothschild put his farm in Rushbrooke, West Suffolk on the market for £24M in May 2015.
