= Mayor (surname) =

Mayor is an English and Spanish-language surname with several etymological origins. The English-language name is sometimes a variant spelling of Mayer, and thus derived from the Middle English and Old French mair, maire (in turn derived from the Latin maior, meaning "greater", "superior"); this surname originated from the title of a mayor. The surname Mayor can also be derived from a nickname, derived from the Spanish mayor, meaning "older", borne by the elder of two individuals with the same name. Another origin of the surname is from an occupational name, derived from the Spanish major, meaning "governor", "chief". The surname can also be a Catalan variant of the surname Major, derived from major, meaning "greater", used to denote an elder son of a particular family or an important person. The surname Mayor can also be derived from the Yiddish personal name Meyer, which is derived from the Hebrew language Meir, which in turn means "enlightener".

The Mayor surname in England was originally a French-language surname of Norman origin.

The Mayor surname originates from, and is a variant of, the personal name Mauger, and carries the meanings of "council spear" and "authority". The French surname became Anglicized after the Norman Conquest of 1066, taking several forms including Mayre in Middle English and eventually Mayor.

== List of persons with the surname ==
- Federico Mayor Zaragoza (1934–2024), Spanish scientist, scholar, politician, diplomat, and poet
- Flora Macdonald Mayor (1872–1932), English novelist
- John Eyton Bickersteth Mayor (1825–1910), English classical scholar
- Joseph Bickersteth Mayor (1828–1916), English classical scholar and philosopher
- Michel Mayor (born 1942), Swiss Astronomy professor at the University of Geneva
- Robert John Grote Mayor (1869–1947), British civil servant
- Teresa Mayor Rothschild (1915–1996), British counter-intelligence officer
- Thomas Mayor (born c.1978), Indigenous Australian activist, now known as Thomas Mayo
