= Harriet Grote =

English biographer

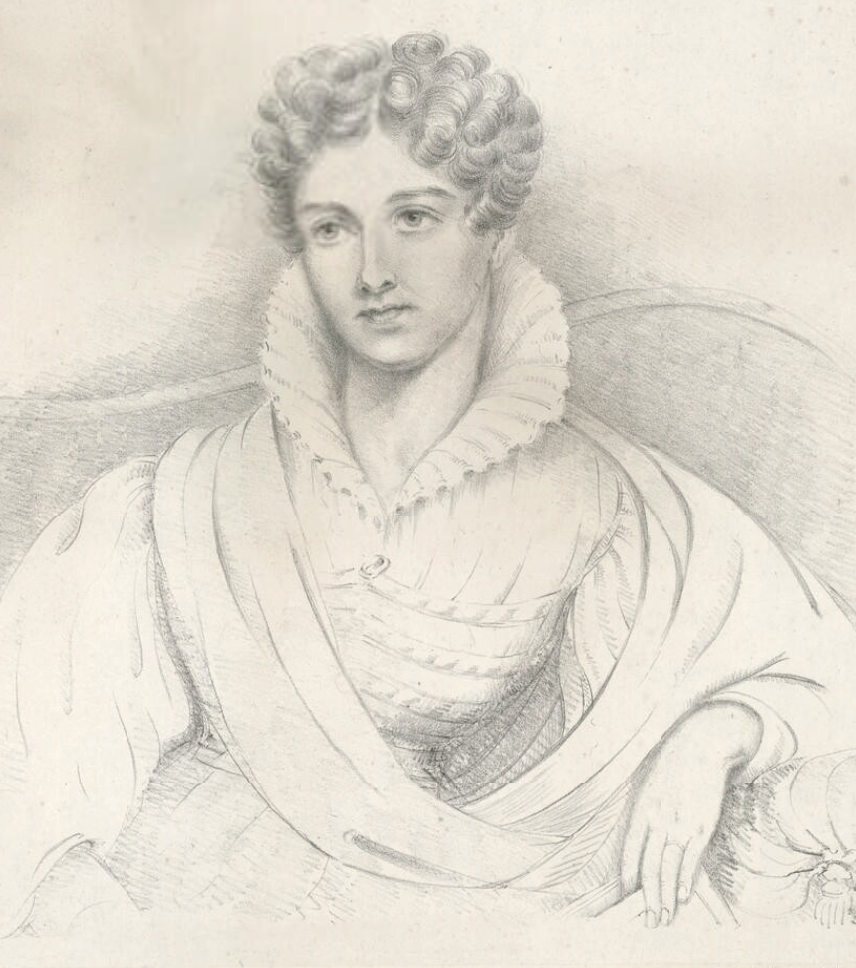
- Born: Harriet Lewin; July 1, 1792; The Ridgeway, near Southampton, England
- Died: December 29, 1878 (aged 86); Shere, Surrey, England
- Resting place: Shere, Surrey, England
- Occupations: biographer, political strategist, patron and early supporter of women's suffrage
- Years active: 1820 - 1878
- Organization: Society of Female Artists (founder)
- Spouse: George Grote (married c.1818-1871)

Harriet Grote (born Harriet Lewin; 1792–1878) was an English biographer, political strategist, patron and early supporter of women's suffrage. She was married to George Grote and was acquainted with many of the English philosophical radicals of the earlier 19th century. A significant political hostess and facilitator of the period, a longterm friend described her as "absolutely unconventional".

== Background ==
Harriet was born at The Ridgeway, near Southampton, on 1 July 1792. She was the second daughter of Thomas Lewin (1753-1837) and Mary Hale (d. 1843). Harriet was described as a gregarious child, riding "horses bare backed and climb[ing] trees. The latter was ably demonstrated near her London home in Green Park."

The Lewins were a large family, lived in style, and kept a London house as well as one in the country. Prior to his marriage, Harriet's father spent some years in the Madras civil service, returning to Europe from Pondicherry in a ship with Madame Grand. In 1784, he married Mary Hale, the daughter of General John Hale and Mary Chaloner, daughter of William Chaloner of Gisborough.

Mary's mother was a noted society beauty, the model in Mrs Hale as Euphrosyne (1764) by Joshua Reynolds. John Hale was a radical involved in the Yorkshire Association of the 1780s, something of which Harriet was conscious (letter of her husband to John Walker Ord).

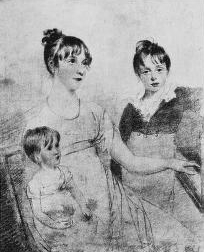
Harriet Lewin, aged 14, with her brother Frederick Mortimer, aged 8, and one-year-old sister Frances, drawing c.1806

== Marriage ==
The Lewins were living at The Hollies, near Bexley in Kent, when at the age of 22, Harriet was introduced to George Grote by George Warde Norman. Peter Elmsley, living at St Mary Cray, falsely claimed to George that he was engaged to Harriet in 1815.

George and Harriet were wed in a clandestine marriage at Bexley Church, after a two-year engagement and resistance to the match from George's father; it was made known in March 1820. Harriet wrote that she and George had "met but seldom". In fact, her father had been turning George away from The Hollies. Despite the obstacles, this courtship period was for Harriet one of reading guided by George: political economy and utilitarianism, atheism, and the views of Jeremy Bentham and Thomas Malthus.

For most of her engagement, Harriet Grote had been living with relations at Merley House, Wimborne.

Harriet and George were married by the Rev. Edward Barnard, vicar of Bexley, and the ceremony took place early in March 1820, according to Harriet's account. They had one biological child, who died young, and "brought up George's brother's three children and adopted the daughter of the 'opera dancer' Fanny Ellsler."

== Residences ==
The Grotes lived in their early married days in London's Threadneedle Street, in a house next to Prescott & Grote, the Grote family bank.

George Grote the elder and his wife Selina were living in Badgemore, and Harriet and George paid a visit after their marriage, in autumn 1820. Harriet, "herself possessed of a domineering character", did not enjoy Selina's nearly uncontested regime of a strict, somewhat gloomy and exclusive evangelicalism, which she characterised as "positively disheartening" and affecting the home with "dullness and vapidity". In Selina's letters, Harriet and George occur in 1826, paying a visit to the Grote home at Beckenham, and later that year attending a muster of Grote sons for the wedding of George's sister Selina to Edward Frederick. From a large family, George's brother John Grote, who became a distinguished Cambridge academic, was then still a boy. George and John came to share interests in philosophy. While Sidney Gelber has cast some doubt on whether Harriet and John got on well, Alexander Bain thought that the brothers had a good relationship, and Gibbins considers that for the 1830s the evidence is that all three were on good terms.

In 1826 Harriet and George bought a small house in Stoke Newington. The elder George Grote died in 1830, with the consequence that George the younger became independently wealthy. Selina moved to Clapham Common.

From 1832 to 1837, the Grotes lived mainly at Dulwich Wood. Then, moving nearer Parliament, they lived at 3 Eccleston Street, off Chester Square. According to William Thomas, Harriet "aspired to be a radical hostess, and to make her house in Ecclestone Street a radical Holland House."

The Grotes moved in 1848 within London's West End to 12 Savile Row.

== Country place at East Burnham, and the History Hut ==
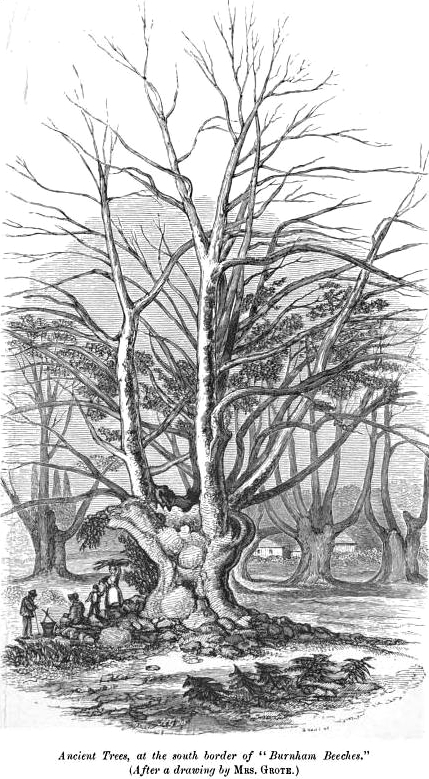
Engraving after Harriet Grote's drawing of "Ancient Trees" on the south side of Burnham Beeches

From 1838, the Grotes also kept a country house at East Burnham, near Burnham Beeches in Buckinghamshire. The "weird picturesqueness" of Burnham Beeches became popular when the Great Western Railway was constructed, with stations a few miles away.

They lived first at East Burnham Cottage. It was associated with Richard Brinsley Sheridan, his future wife Elizabeth Ann Linley, and her escape from an importunate suitor. There was a portrait of Elizabeth by Joshua Reynolds at The Hollies, Harriet's parental home.

East Burnham Cottage was replaced by a small house, which they had built in the neighbourhood and occupied under the name of "History Hut", from the beginning of 1853 until the end of 1857. It was in fact Harriet's project, "a small Elizabethan house to be built in Popple's Park", undertaken from 1852, once profits from the multi-volume History of Greece began to accrue. Harriet had given support to this, George Grote's major scholarly work, from the outset, suggesting the title and dealing with the publisher. She had a bowl of punch made, for Christmas 1855, to celebrate at the History Hut the completion of its 12 volumes.

Then for reasons detailed by Harriet Grote in her Account of the Hamlet of East Burnham, they decided to leave the area. According to Francis George Heath, writing on Burnham Beeches in 1879, "no right of estovers has belonged to the commoners of East Burnham, and the lord of the manor ... had alone the sole right of touching the trees." Grote's work deals in part with "commoners' rights and privileges, and ... her efforts to maintain them on behalf of her poor neighbours". In 1885, when the East Burnham Common was bought by the Corporation of London, it was considered that the commoners had rights of pasture and turbary, but not estovers. There is evidence, however, that pollarding of the trees did occur in conjunction with pasturage.

The park land on which the History Hut was built was purchased in 1844 by George Grote from Robert Gordon. Another aspect of Account of the Hamlet of East Burnham was Harriet's tracing of the descent of the old East Burnham House from Charles Eyre (died 1786) to Gordon. That house had been demolished by Gordon c.1837; the name continued, attached to the History Hut.

== Later life ==
In 1857, Harriet Grote was one of the founders, if not the principal founder, of the Society of Female Artists. Augustus Hare described a visit she made to Oxford in 1857:

"Mrs Grote sat with one leg over the other, both high in the air, and talked for two hours, turning with equal facility to Saffi on Italian Literature, Max Müller on Epic Poetry, and Arthur on Ecclesiastical History, and then plunged into a discourse on the best manure for turnips, and the best way of forcing Cotswold mutton, with an interlude first upon the 'harmony of shadow' in water-colour drawing, and then upon rat-hunts at Jemmy Shawe's – a low public-house in Westminster. Upon all these subject she was equally vigorous, and gave all her decisions with the manner and tone of one laying down the laws of Athens...

From 1859, the Grotes took Barrow Green Court in Surrey, which had once been occupied by Jeremy Bentham. The marriage was under threat during the early 1860s, when George (on Harriet's account) became infatuated with Susan Durant. They left Barrow Green Court in 1863. In 1864 they settled finally at Shere, Surrey, at The Ridgeway, as it was called by Harriet after the place of her birth.

In a piece published in her Collected Papers, on the law of marriage, Harriet Grote wrote

...I maintain, and shall maintain to the end, that the first of all remedial measures to be sought for by women, and for which they should clamour, beg, and agitate, is "equality of rights over property with the other sex."

George Grote had been a party in a chancery case on such a matter, Peters v Grote, of 1835, occurring in the family of a radical reformer (see Henry Revell). With this legal side as priority, Harriet did become involved in other women's issues. She supported the Langham Place circle. She contributed to the Victoria Regia of Adelaide Anne Procter in 1861, with an essay On Art, Ancient and Modern. Her niece Sarah Lewin acted as secretary of the associated Society for Promoting the Employment of Women, which Harriet also supported. She was close to the activist Lady Amberley. Her social views generally are taken to be "radical-individualist".

Harriet signed the suffrage petition of 1866. She spoke at the first public meeting of the London National Society for Women's Suffrage in 1869. She spoke again at Clementia Taylor's 1870 meeting in the Hanover Square Rooms, her suffragist arguments being reported by Helen Blackburn.

She remained active to the last. W. E. Gladstone met Mark Pattison at her home in 1875. She died at Shere on 29 December 1878, in her 87th year, and was buried there. Biographical works appeared, by Jules Fournet in 1879, and by Lady Eastlake in 1880.

== Associations ==
Her marriage detached Harriet Grote from the gentry circles in which she had been brought up. The Philosophical Radicals, who formed George's intellectual and social circle, she found dour, theoretical and irreligious. A number of them were near neighbours in Threadneedle Street, in particular Jeremy Bentham and James Mill. There were regular mornings with Charles Buller, John Stuart Mill, Thomas Eyton Tooke and others. An overlapping discussion group on political economy, in which Harriet also joined and which she called the "Brangles", included too David Ricardo and John Ramsay McCulloch.

Of old friends, and not of interest to George, Harriet retained the Plumers of Gilston Park; William Plumer (1736–1822) MP, close to Lord William Bentinck, was a "distant cousin" of the Lewins, and Lord William and his wife befriended Harriet. Her naval brother Richard John Lewin married in 1825 Plumer's widow Jane, daughter of George Hamilton, but died after two years. Harriet arranged a small dinner for the purpose of discussion between James Mill and Lord William, shortly before the latter sailed to become Governor-General of India in 1828.

During George Grote's parliamentary period, from 1832 to 1841, Harriet supported him by holding together the party of radical reformers socially. Indeed, in letters such as she wrote to Francis Place, she was more assertive than that, playing a leadership role. Both Place and Richard Cobden were under the impression that, had she been a man, she could have emerged as the leader of the Philosophical Radicals. George and Harriet took under their wing Sir William Molesworth, 8th Baronet, a radical MP from 1832, and Harriet became "his mentor and confidante", a relationship lasting until his marriage in 1844.

Later, Harriet Grote's social circle was broad: it has been described as "an extensive group of (mainly but not exclusively) liberal and radical intellectuals, politicians, writers and artists." One opinion was that Harriet Grote had

a most curious salon, where practically all worlds met, artists as well as savants and politicians, and which was quite assiduously frequented by, among others, John Stuart Mill, Carlyle and his wife, Cornwall Lewis, Sidney Smith [sic], not to mention Thalberg, Lablache, and, during his visits to London, Mendelssohn [...]

The wit Sydney Smith coined "queen of the radicals" for Harriet, but also the unkind quip that she was the origin of the term grotesque.

=== The musical world ===
An accomplished musician, Grote cultivated friendly relations with performers including Jenny Lind. Richard Monckton Milnes wrote to Sophia MacCarthy, wife of Charles Justin MacCarthy, in 1849 about an important passage in Lind's emotional life:

Jenny Lind's marriage is again deferred. She cannot make up her mind to marry a very good, good-looking, infinitely stupid man she has engaged herself to, and at the same time has not the cruelty to throw him over; so she goes to Paris, to Mrs Grote, for a month or two, when she is to give her final decision.

=== French connections ===
Thomas Lewin, Harriet's father, was an admirer of French literature. Harriet first visited Paris in 1817. By 1827 she was corresponding on political economy with Jean Baptiste Say.

In May 1830, the Grotes were in Paris, staying also at the Château de la Grange-Bléneau with Gilbert du Motier, Marquis de Lafayette. This visit to Lafayette, on a shortened form of an intended journey to Switzerland, took place with an introduction from Charles Comte, son-in-law of Say. It was shortly before the July Revolution: George Grote sent money to support it, through Comte.

Harriet from then on cultivated French public men. Thomas Carlyle in the late 1830s described with relish to Jane Carlyle the process of Charles Buller introducing Godefroi Cavaignac to her. George Sand gave her writer friend Charles Duvernet a detailed briefing on what to say to Harriet on meeting.

In 1852, Harriet took a political article in Paris from Alexis de Tocqueville, on the 1851 French coup d'état, and saw through Henry Reeve that it was published in London in The Times.

== Personal life ==
=== Family ===
Harriet Grote went down with puerperal fever after the premature delivery in 1821 of the only child of her marriage, a boy who lived only a week. She was attended by Dr. Robert Batty. In later life she suffered from neuralgia.

George's brother Andrew Grote, of the Bengal Civil Service, died in 1835, shortly after his wife; leaving two sons and two daughters as orphans. Another brother in Bengal, Arthur Grote, lost his first wife in childbirth in 1838, and sent his children home. Harriet "supposed" that she would take them in, in a letter of 1843 to her sister Frances Eliza in Stockholm, married to Neil von Koch, which said also that Andrew's eldest daughter, aged 13, was ill. That daughter was Alexandrina Jessie ("Ally" or "Allie") Grote (1831–1927), adopted by George's brother John. She married Joseph Bickersteth Mayor and was mother of the novelist F. M. Mayor.

The actor William Terriss, the father of Ellaline Terriss, was Harriet's nephew, the son of her brother George Herbert Lewin and his wife Mary Friend.

=== Reputation and appearance ===
Charles Sumner wrote to Horatio Greenough in 1841 about a letter of introduction to the Grotes, stating that Harriet was "a masculine person, without children, interested very much in politics, and one of the most remarkable women in England." He added that from William Ellery Channing he had had Catharine Sedgwick's opinion that Harriet was "the most remarkable woman she had met in Europe."

According to Augustus Hare who had met her, "She was, to the last, one of the most original women in England, shrewd, generous, and excessively vain." G. M. Young in an essay wrote of her:

In Mrs. Grote, who would have been a far more effective Member of Parliament than her husband, who sat with her red stockings higher than her head, discomfited a dinner-party by saying "disembowelled" quite bold and plain, and knew when a hoop was off a pail in the back kitchen, the great lady is formidably ascendant [...]

Minnie Simpson (1825–1907), née Mary Charlotte Mair Senior, was a daughter of Nassau Senior. She knew Harriet as a long-term family friend, and wrote in Many Memories of Many People (1898) an extended account of her as a person, initially comparing her to Queen Elizabeth I. It is stated there that it was the shoes that were red "which she said were admired by Sydney Smith":

Her dress was characteristic; it did not change with the fashion. She always wore short skirts, no crinoline, white stockings and high shoes ...

The comment about the pail is found in Lady Eastlake's memoir, coming from a discussion of neighbours in Surrey. Minnie Simpson gives a basis for Harriet's approach to estate management, quoting a letter from the Grotes' property at Long Bennington.

== Works ==
Grote wrote the following published works:

- The Case of the Poor against the Rich, fairly considered (1850), anonymous. It was influenced by works of de Tocqueville and Léon Faucher dealing with economics and pauperism, in the British context.
- Some Account of the Hamlet of East Burnham (1858), for private circulation
- Memoir of the Life of Ary Scheffer (1860 and second edition that year)
- Collected Papers (1862). It included articles first published in the Edinburgh Review, Westminster Review and The Spectator.
- The Philosophical Radicals of 1832 (1866, printed for private circulation). It included a Life of Sir William Molesworth, 8th Baronet.
- The Personal Life of George Grote (1873)
- Posthumous Papers (1874, for private circulation), edited by Harriet Grote, is a miscellany of materials, such as correspondence, articles and commonplace book entries, related to the Grotes and their circle.
- A brief Retrospect of the Political Events of 1831–1832, as illustrated by the Greville and Althorp Memoirs (1878), pamphlet

From 1842 to 1852 she wrote in The Spectator.

== Collections ==
University College London holds letters from Grote and George Grote to Thomas Spencer Baynes.
