= Robert John Grote Mayor =

Robert "Robin" John Grote Mayor CB (20 August 1869 – 19 June 1947) was a British civil servant at the Education Department and philosopher.

== Early life and education ==
Mayor was born in Twickenham, Surrey, into two prominent families. His father was noted scholar Joseph Bickersteth Mayor, a member of the distinguished Bickersteth ecclesiastical family. His mother, Alexandrina Jessie Grote, was the niece of historian George Grote, philosopher John Grote, and colonial administrator Arthur Grote.

His younger sister was the writer Flora Macdonald Mayor.

He was educated at Temple Grove School and then at Eton College, where he was awarded the Newcastle Scholarship. He earned first-class honours at King's College, Cambridge, and he won the Inter-Varsity Cross Country Championship in 1891.

== Career ==
In 1896, Grote joined the Education Department of the Privy Council as a Junior Examiner. He became an Assistant Secretary in 1907 and Principal Assistant Secretary in 1919. He retired in 1926.

Grote was also a barrister; in 1899, he was called to the Bar by Lincoln's Inn.

Mayor was appointed a Companion of the Order of the Bath in the 1919 Birthday Honours.

== Philosophy ==
Mayor was devoted to philosophy. Following his retirement from the civil service, he devoted his time to a book on the subject. He sent the final pages to the typist in June and unexpectedly died shortly after. It was published in 1952.

== Mountaineering ==
Mayor was a keen alpinist and spent his leisure time ascending the peaks of Europe. In 1902, he was elected to the Alpine Club. He frequently climbed with Geoffrey Winthrop Young, who wrote, "Robin Mayor's happy mountaineering habit was to make every party, plan, pace, length of expedition and degree of difficulty seem to his friends exactly the one which suited him best."

== Personal life ==
In 1912, Mayor married Beatrice Meinertzhagen, daughter of banker Daniel Meinertzhagen and sister of Richard Meinertzhagen. Beatrice, a writer, was named after her maternal aunt Beatrice Webb (née Potter). Their daughter was Teresa Rothschild, Baroness Rothschild.

He died at the National Temperance Hospital in London, the day after an operation.

== Bibliography ==
- Mayor, R. J. G. (1952). Reason and common sense; an inquiry into some problems of philosophy. London: Routledge & K. Paul.
