= Emma Rothschild =

English historian (born 1948)

The Honourable Emma Rothschild CMG
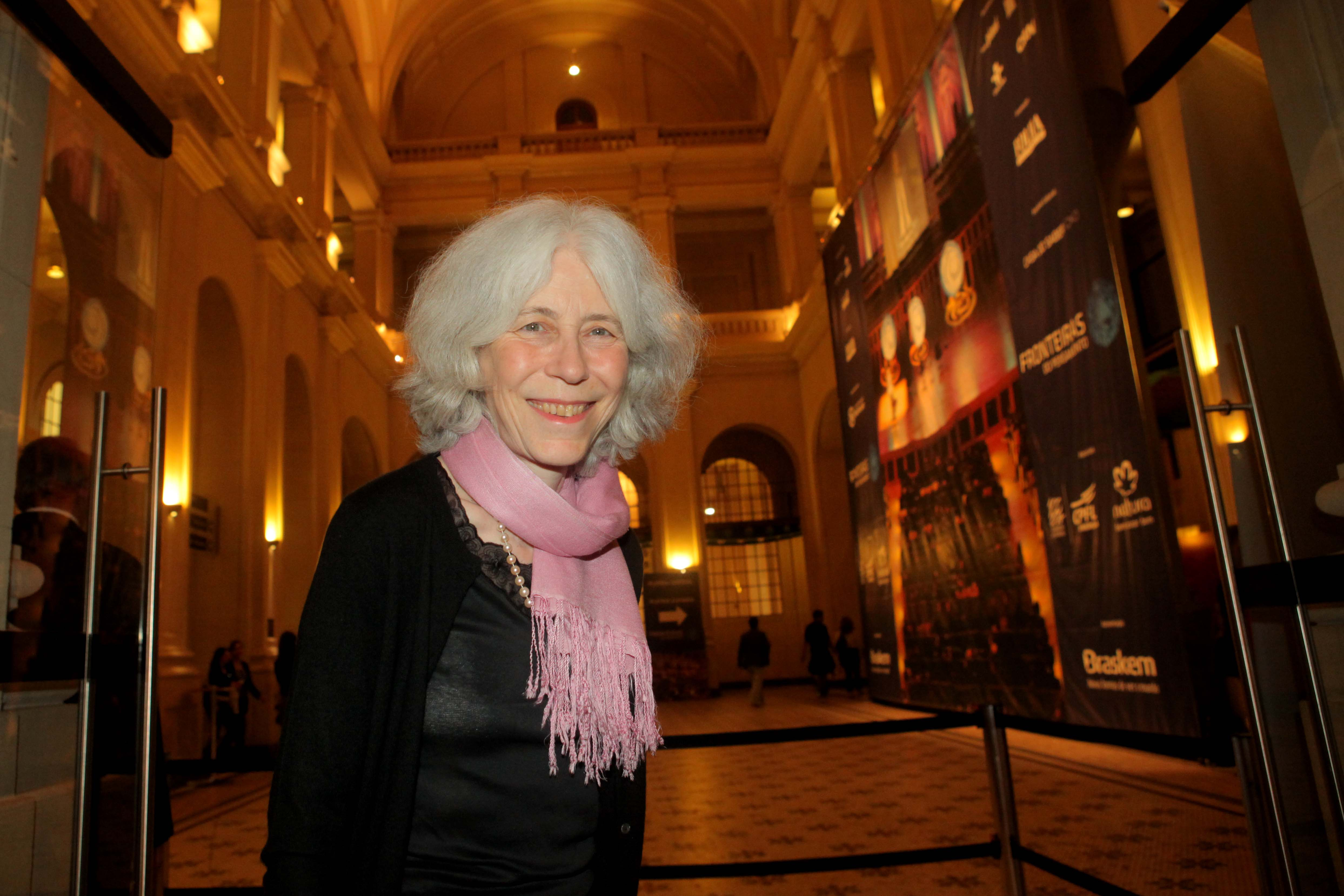
- Born: Emma Georgina Rothschild; 16 May 1948 (age 78); London, England
- Education: Somerville College, Oxford; Massachusetts Institute of Technology
- Occupations: Economist and economic historian
- Employers: Massachusetts Institute of Technology; University of Cambridge; École des hautes études en sciences sociales
- Spouse: Amartya Sen (m. 1991)
- Parent(s): Victor Rothschild; Teresa Georgina Mayor
- Relatives: Rothschild family Rothschild banking family of England

Emma Georgina Rothschild CMG (born 16 May 1948) is an English economic historian, a professor of history at Harvard University. She is director of the Joint Centre for History and Economics at Harvard, and an honorary Professor of History and Economics at the University of Cambridge. She formerly served as board member of United Nations Foundation and as a professor at the École des hautes études en sciences sociales (EHESS) in Paris.

She is a member of the Rothschild banking family of England and a trustee of the Rothschild Archive, the international centre in London for research into the history of the Rothschild family.

== Early life and education ==
Rothschild was born in London, England, the daughter of Victor Rothschild (1910–1990) and his second wife, Teresa Georgina Rothschild (née Mayor; 1915–1996). On her father's side, she descends from the Rothschild family. Her maternal grandfather, Robert John Grote Mayor, was the brother of English novelist F. M. Mayor and a great-nephew of philosopher and clergyman John Grote. Her maternal grandmother, Katherine Beatrice Meinertzhagen, was the sister of soldier Richard Meinertzhagen and the niece of author Beatrice Webb. She is the sister of Amschel Mayor James Rothschild and the half-sister of Jacob Rothschild, 4th Baron Rothschild. At the age of 15, she became the youngest woman ever admitted to Somerville College, Oxford, from which she graduated with a BA degree in Philosophy, Politics and Economics in 1967. She was a Kennedy Scholar in Economics at the Massachusetts Institute of Technology (MIT).

== Professorships ==
She was an associate professor at MIT in the Department of Humanities and the Program on Science, Technology, and Society, and also taught at the École des Hautes Études en Sciences Sociales in Paris, France. She later became a Fellow at King's College, Cambridge, and is an honorary Professor of History and Economics at the Faculty of History, University of Cambridge.

== Academic achievements, awards and honours ==
She was elected to the American Philosophical Society in 2002. She is a fellow of Magdalene College, Cambridge.

She is an Honorary Fellow of Somerville College, Oxford.

== Personal life ==
In 1991, Rothschild married the Indian economist and Nobel laureate Amartya Sen.

== Publications ==
She has written extensively on economic history and the history of economic thought. Some of her publications are:

- Paradise Lost: The Decline of the Auto-Industrial Age (1973)
- Common Security and Civil Society in Africa (1999) (Co-Editor)
- Economic Sentiments: Adam Smith, Condorcet and the Enlightenment (2001)
- "Language and Empire, circa 1800" (Historical Research, 2005)
- "A Horrible Tragedy in the French Atlantic" (Past and Present) (2006)
- The Inner Life of Empires: An Eighteenth-Century History (2011)
- An Infinite History. The Story of a Family in France over Three Centuries (2021)

== See also ==
- Rothschild banking family of England
