= Hannah Rothschild =

Hannah Rothschild may refer to:

- Hannah Primrose, Countess of Rosebery (1851–1890), née Rothschild
- Hannah Rothschild (film maker) (born 1962), British writer, philanthropist, and documentary filmmaker
