= Nicky Hilton =

American socialite, fashion designer, and model (born 1983)

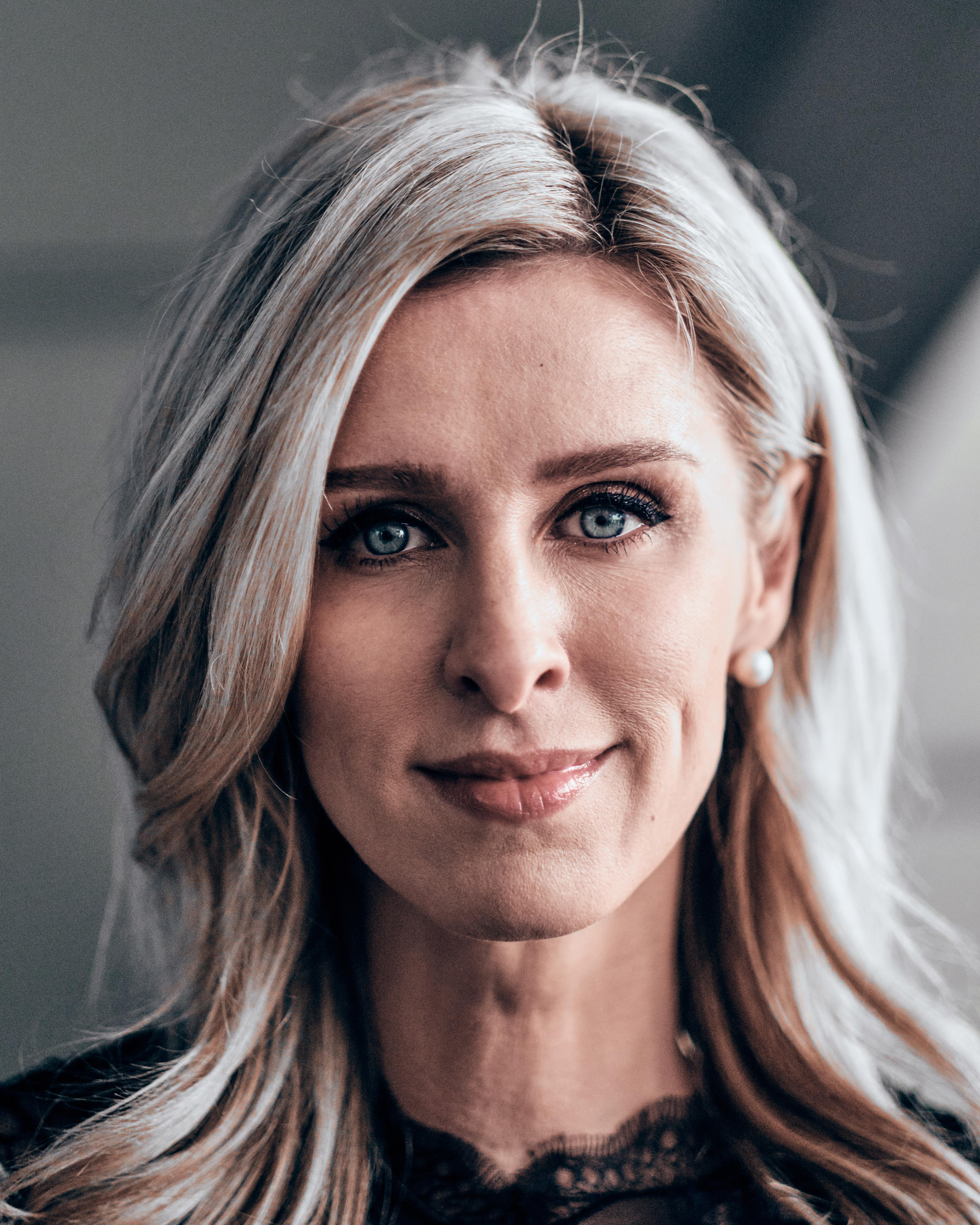
- Hilton in 2019
- Born: Nicholai Olivia Hilton; October 5, 1983 (age 43); New York City, U.S.
- Occupations: Socialite; fashion designer; model
- Years active: 1992–present
- Spouses: Todd Meister (m. 2004; ann. 2004) James Rothschild (m. 2015)
- Children: 3
- Parents: Richard Hilton (father); Kathy Hilton (mother)
- Relatives: Hilton family; Rothschild family (by marriage)
- Website: nickyhilton.com

Nicholai Olivia "Nicky" Hilton Rothschild (née Hilton; born October 5, 1983) is an American socialite, fashion designer and model. She is a member of the Hilton family by birth and of the Rothschild family following her 2015 marriage to James Rothschild, a grandson of Victor Rothschild, 3rd Baron Rothschild. Hilton is the younger sister of Paris Hilton.

== Early life ==
Hilton was born on October 5, 1983, in New York City to Richard Hilton and Kathy Hilton (née Avanzino). She was raised in Los Angeles Hilton was named after her great-uncle, Conrad "Nicky" Hilton Jr. Her siblings are Paris Hilton (born 1981), Barron Hilton II (born 1989), and Conrad Hughes Hilton (born 1994).

Hilton was raised Catholic. Hilton graduated from Convent of the Sacred Heart, an all-girls Catholic school on the Upper East Side, in 2001. She took courses at Fashion Institute of Technology and Parsons The New School for Design without earning a degree.

== Career ==
=== Fashion design ===
In 2004, Hilton launched her own clothing line. She also designed a line of handbags for Japanese company Samantha Thavasa. In 2007, she started her second line, Nicholai, at a higher price point. Nicholai held its fashion show for the spring/summer 2008 season on September 9, 2007, in New York City during Mercedes-Benz Fashion Week. In 2014, Hilton launched a 10-piece collection with eLuxe.

In 2010, Hilton launched an Art Deco–inspired fashion jewelry line, followed by a classic-style handbag capsule collection with Linea Pelle in 2015.

In 2017, Hilton partnered with Tolani on a Mommy and Me collection followed by a travel-inspired line in 2019, and also launched her first footwear collection, Nicky Hilton x French Sole, that same year.

In October 2024, she partnered with Australian designer Rebecca Vallance on a fashion collection called "The Nicky Hilton for Rebecca Vallance Holiday Collection.” This unveiling was launched alongside her 41st birthday celebration.

On June 24, 2025, Hilton launched Theo Grace, her first fine jewelry line named after her daughters and focused on customizable pieces, debuting at the SeaGlass Carousel with backing from the Tenen Group.

=== Modeling ===
In 2005, Hilton was the face of Australian underwear line Antz Pantz alongside Kimberly Stewart. Stewart remains contracted, but Hilton has been replaced by Australian model Megan Maitland. Around this time, Hilton modeled for the cover of Lucire for its New Zealand and Romanian editions.

=== Other ventures ===
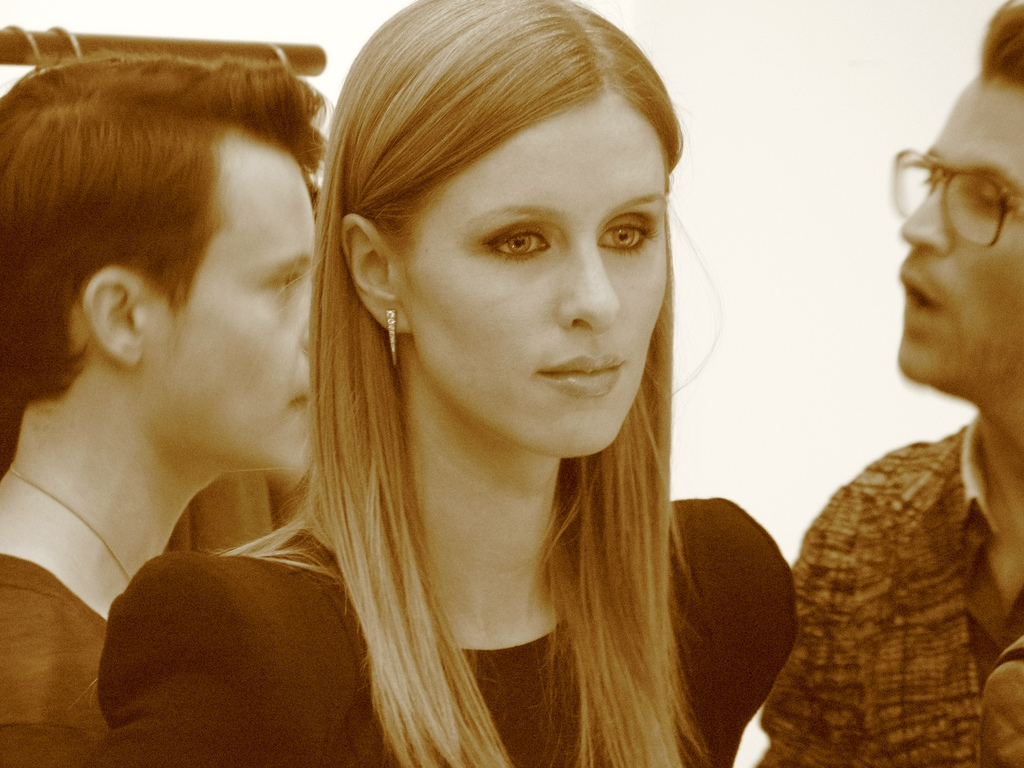
Hilton in September 2010

In 2006, Hilton entered a partnership to open two Nicky O Hotels, the first in Miami and the second in Chicago. That same year, she sued her partner in Federal Court in Los Angeles for damages and to seek an injunction against his use of the name. On February 12, 2007, Hilton was sued for breach of contract by her partners.

In 2014, she published her first book, 365 Style, published by Harlequin, a subsidiary of HarperCollins.

In 2015, Hilton collaborated with Smashbox, the cosmetic brand owned by Estée Lauder Companies, to create a cosmetic line consisting of three limited-edition cat-inspired makeup kits.

==== Theo Grace ====
Theo Grace (formerly MYKA) is a jewelry line co-founded by Nicky Hilton. It operates in more than 30 countries and produces custom necklaces, bracelets, rings, and earrings. Theo Grace was originally launched as MyNameNecklace in 2006, but was renamed as MYKA in 2021. It was renamed as Theo Grace again in 2025. The name combines co-founder Nicky Hilton's daughters’ names, Theodora and Lily Grace.

Theo Grace offers customizable fine jewelry in sterling silver, gold vermeil, and diamond-studded styles. Styles include name necklaces, initial pendants, birthstone, and diamond jewelry. Nicky Hilton x Theo Grace – Charmed Collection contains signature pieces curated by Hilton. Theo Grace also incorporates lab-grown diamonds in select pieces.

== Personal life ==
At 2:30 a.m. on August 15, 2004, Hilton married childhood friend and businessman Todd Meister at the Vegas Wedding Chapel in Las Vegas, Nevada. The marriage was annulled less than three months later, with Hilton and Meister explaining they traveled apart often and had married "on a whim".

In 2011, Hilton began dating financier James Rothschild, a member of the Rothschild family and only son of Amschel Rothschild. On August 12, 2014, Hilton became engaged to Rothschild. They were married on July 10, 2015, in London, England. They have three children.
