= Amschel Rothschild =

British businessman (1955–1996)

The Honourable Amschel Rothschild
- Born: Amschel Mayor James Rothschild; 18 April 1955; Paris, France
- Died: 8 July 1996 (aged 41); Paris, France
- Occupation: Businessman
- Spouse: Anita Patience Guinness (m. 1981)
- Children: 3, including James Rothschild
- Parent(s): Victor Rothschild, 3rd Baron Rothschild; Teresa Georgina Mayor
- Family: Rothschild

Amschel Mayor James Rothschild (18 April 1955 – 8 July 1996) was a British businessman who was the executive chairman of Rothschild Asset Management of the Rothschild banking family of England.

== Early years and kinships ==
Rothschild was born in Paris, the youngest child of Victor Rothschild, 3rd Baron Rothschild and his second wife, Teresa Georgina Rothschild (née Mayor). On his father's side, he descended from the Rothschild family. His half-brother was Jacob Rothschild, 4th Baron Rothschild. His maternal grandfather, Robert John Grote Mayor, was the brother of English novelist F. M. Mayor and a great-nephew of philosopher and clergyman John Grote. His maternal grandmother, Katherine Beatrice Meinertzhagen, of English and German descent, was the sister of soldier Richard Meinertzhagen and the niece of author Beatrice Webb.

He attended King's College School, Cambridge, and was then educated at The Leys School. He graduated in 1976 from City University (London), where he read economics, history and archaeology. His initial vocation was journalism, as a circulation manager of the now defunct literary magazine, The New Review.

== Career ==
In 1987, Rothschild joined the family banking firm, N M Rothschild & Sons. By 1990 he was made chief executive of one of the Rothschild's weaker assets, Rothschild Asset Management. In 1993, he became chairman of the firm, helping to steer it onto a more stable path.

One of his favourite pastimes was farming. Rothschild had inherited an arable farm, Rushbrooke, near Bury St. Edmunds where he spent many hours at work. He was also a keen racer of cars. His passion started when he acquired a scrambler motorcycle, at age thirteen. In later life, he got into motor racing, and was the winner of the Peter Collins Memorial Trophy Race at Silverstone in 1996. Among his car collection was an AC Cobra Daytona sports car, a 1957 Maserati 250F Formula I, and a 1958 BRM P25 Formula I. He kept a Stampe at his home in Suffolk.

Rothschild was a trustee of Yad Hanadiv, the Rothschild foundation which has supported many projects in Israel, including the building of the Supreme Court and Knesset in Jerusalem.

== Personal life ==
In 1981, he married Anita Patience Guinness, daughter of the merchant banker James Edward Alexander Rundell Guinness and Pauline Vivien Mander. They had three children:

- Kate Emma Rothschild (born 1982) who married Ben Goldsmith, a son of the late billionaire Sir James Goldsmith and Lady Annabel Goldsmith, in 2003 at St. Mary's Church in Bury St. Edmunds. They have three children. In 2012, the couple announced they were divorcing after it was alleged Kate had an affair with American rapper Jay Electronica.
- Alice Miranda Rothschild (born 1983) was married to Zac Goldsmith, British Conservative Party politician, and the brother of her sister Kate's former husband. They have three children.
- James Amschel Victor Rothschild (born 1985), who married Nicky Hilton, socialite great-granddaughter of hotelier Conrad Hilton, in 2015. They have two daughters and a son.

Rothschild and his wife were also godparents to a daughter of politician William Waldegrave, who is a godfather to James Rothschild.

Amschel Rothschild owned a summer home at Alton, New Hampshire.

== Death ==
In July 1996, Amschel Rothschild died by suicide at the Hôtel Le Bristol Paris. The coroner said there were no sinister circumstances about his death. His wife attributed the suicide to untreated depression, partly over the recent death of his widowed mother.
