= Rebecca Vallance =

Australian fashion designer (born 1980)

Rebecca Vallance boutique in Claremont Quarter

Rebecca Vallance (born 1980) is an Australian fashion designer. She is the founder of the brand Rebecca Vallance which has 10 stores across Australia.

Vallance was born in Ballarat, Victoria in 1980. She has two younger brothers. She attended Ballarat High School and earned a Bachelor of Business at Victoria University. She married David Gasan in 2010 and the couple have two sons.

In 2023, Vallance was named designer of the year at Marie Claire Australia's Women of the Year awards.

In 2024, Vallance and Nicky Hilton collaborated on a collection for Saks.

In September 2025, Australian airline Qantas announced that Vallance would design its new uniforms. The uniforms are set to be unveiled in 2027.
