= Joseph Bickersteth Mayor =

English writer and scholar (1828–1916)

Joseph Mayor
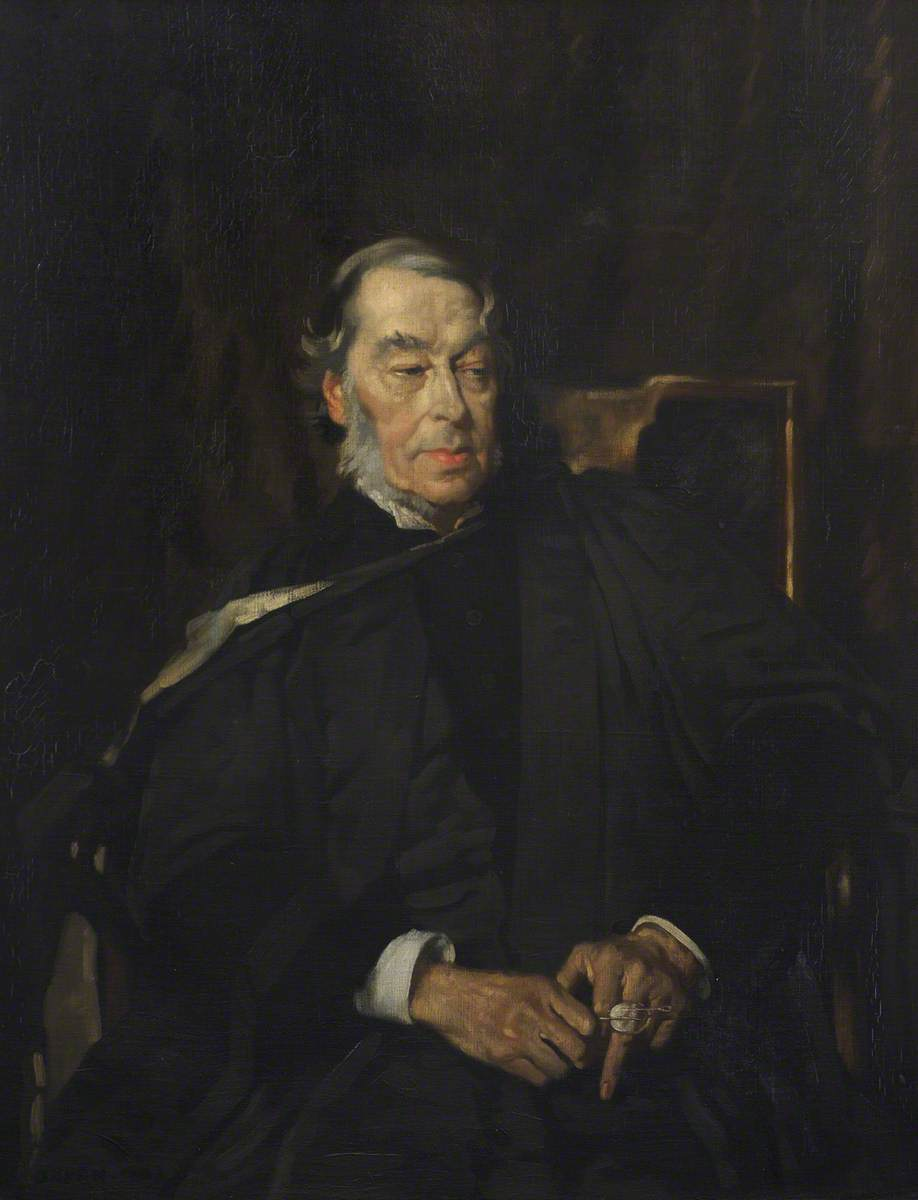
- Portrait by Sir William Orpen, 1907
- Born: 24 October 1828; Cape Colony, South Africa
- Died: 29 November 1916 (aged 88); Kingston-on-Thames, England
- Education: Rugby School
- Alma mater: St John's College, Cambridge
- Occupations: Writer; scholar
- Spouse: Alexandrina Jessie Grote (m. 1863)
- Children: 4
- Relatives: 1st Baron Langdale (uncle); Edward Bickersteth (uncle); John E. B. Mayor (brother); F. M. Mayor (daughter); Teresa Rothschild (granddaughter)

Joseph Bickersteth Mayor (24 October 1828 – 29 November 1916) was an English writer and scholar. He was best known for his books Greek for Beginners (1880), Sketch of Ancient Philosophy (1881), and Chapters on English Metre (1886).

== Early life and education ==
Mayor was born in Cape Colony while his parents returned from Ceylon. He was the fourth son and eighth child of twelve born to Rev. Robert Mayor (1791–1846) and Charlotte Bickersteth (1792–1846). His mother came from the prominent Bickersteth family and was the sister of Henry Bickersteth, 1st Baron Langdale and Rev. Edward Bickersteth. John E. B. Mayor was his elder brother.

Mayor was educated at Rugby School and St John's College, Cambridge (B.A., 1851; M.A., 1853).

== Career ==
Mayor was ordained as a deacon in 1859 and as a priest the following year. He became a Fellow of St. John's in 1852 and lectured until 1863, and served as a tutor from 1860. He became Headmaster of Kensington Proprietary School (1863–69) before returning to higher education at King's College London, where he was Professor of Classical Literature (1870–79) and of Moral Philosophy (1879–83).

Mayor served as the first editor of the Classical Review (1887–94), and published and edited several volumes on the classics and philosophy, including Greek for Beginners (1880), Sketch of Ancient Philosophy (1881), and Chapters on English Metre (1886). He edited several works by John Grote (his wife's uncle), including Exploratio Philosophica (1865) and the posthumous An Examination of Utilitarian Philosophy (1870) and A Treatise on the Moral Ideals (1876). His theological works included The Epistle of St. James: Greek Text with Introductory Notes and Comments (1892), The Epistle of St. Jude, and The Second Epistle of St. Peter.

== Personal life ==
He married Alexandrina Jessie Grote, daughter of Andrew Grote and niece of historian George Grote, philosopher John Grote, and colonial administrator Arthur Grote. They had two sons, civil servant Robert John Grote Mayor (1869–1947) and Henry Bickersteth Mayor (1870–1948) and twin daughters, author Flora MacDonald Mayor (1872–1932) and Alice MacDonald Mayor (1872–1961).

Teresa Mayor Rothschild (1915–1996), wife of the 3rd Baron Rothschild, was his granddaughter.
