= Thomas Spencer Baynes =

English writer and scholar (1823–1887)

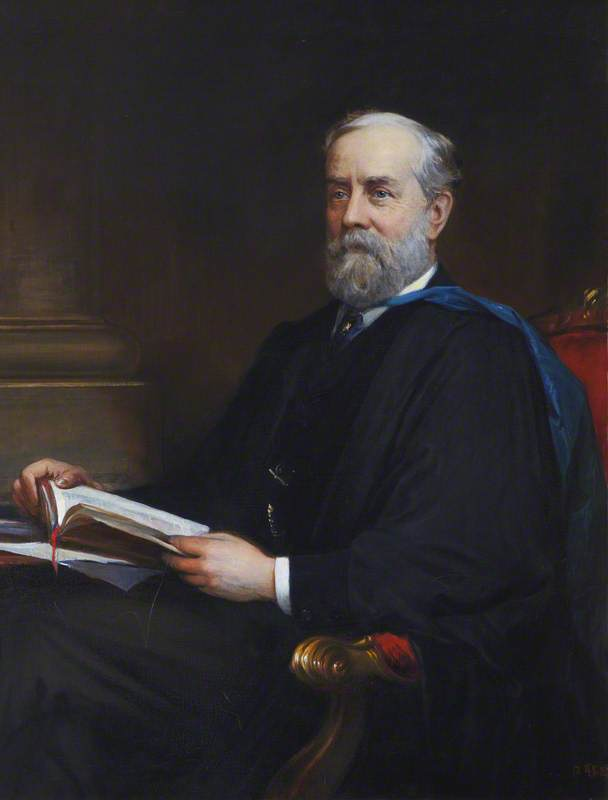
- Portrait of Thomas Spencer Baynes, painted in 1888
- Born: 24 March 1823; Wellington, Somerset, England
- Died: 31 May 1887 (aged 64); London, England
- Occupations: Writer; scholar

Thomas Spencer Baynes (24 March 1823 – 31 May 1887) was an English writer and scholar. He was best known for serving as the Editor-in-Chief of Encyclopædia Britannica. He was also well known for his essays in the Edinburgh Review and Fraser's Magazine.

== Life ==
Baynes was born in Wellington, Somerset to a Baptist minister. He intended to study for Baptist ministry, and was at a theological seminary at Bath with that view but, being strongly attracted to philosophical studies, left it and went to Edinburgh, where he became the favourite pupil of Sir William Hamilton, of whose philosophical system he continued an adherent.

After working as editor of a newspaper in Edinburgh, and after an interval of rest rendered necessary by a breakdown in health, Baynes resumed journalistic work in 1858 as assistant editor of the Daily News. In 1864 he was appointed Professor of Logic and English Literature at St Andrews University, in which capacity his mind was drawn to the study of Shakespeare, and he contributed to the Edinburgh Review and Fraser's Magazine valuable papers (chiefly relating to his vocabulary and the extent of his learning) afterwards collected as Shakespeare Studies.

In 1873, he was appointed to superintend the ninth edition of the Encyclopædia Britannica, a task with which, after 1880, he was assisted by William Robertson Smith. Baynes was the first English-born editor of the Britannica; all earlier editors were Scottish.

== Collections ==
University College London holds letters from George Grote, Harriet Grote, and Jessie Lewin to Baynes.
