= Yad Hanadiv =

Rothschild family philanthropic foundation in Israel

- יד הנדיב
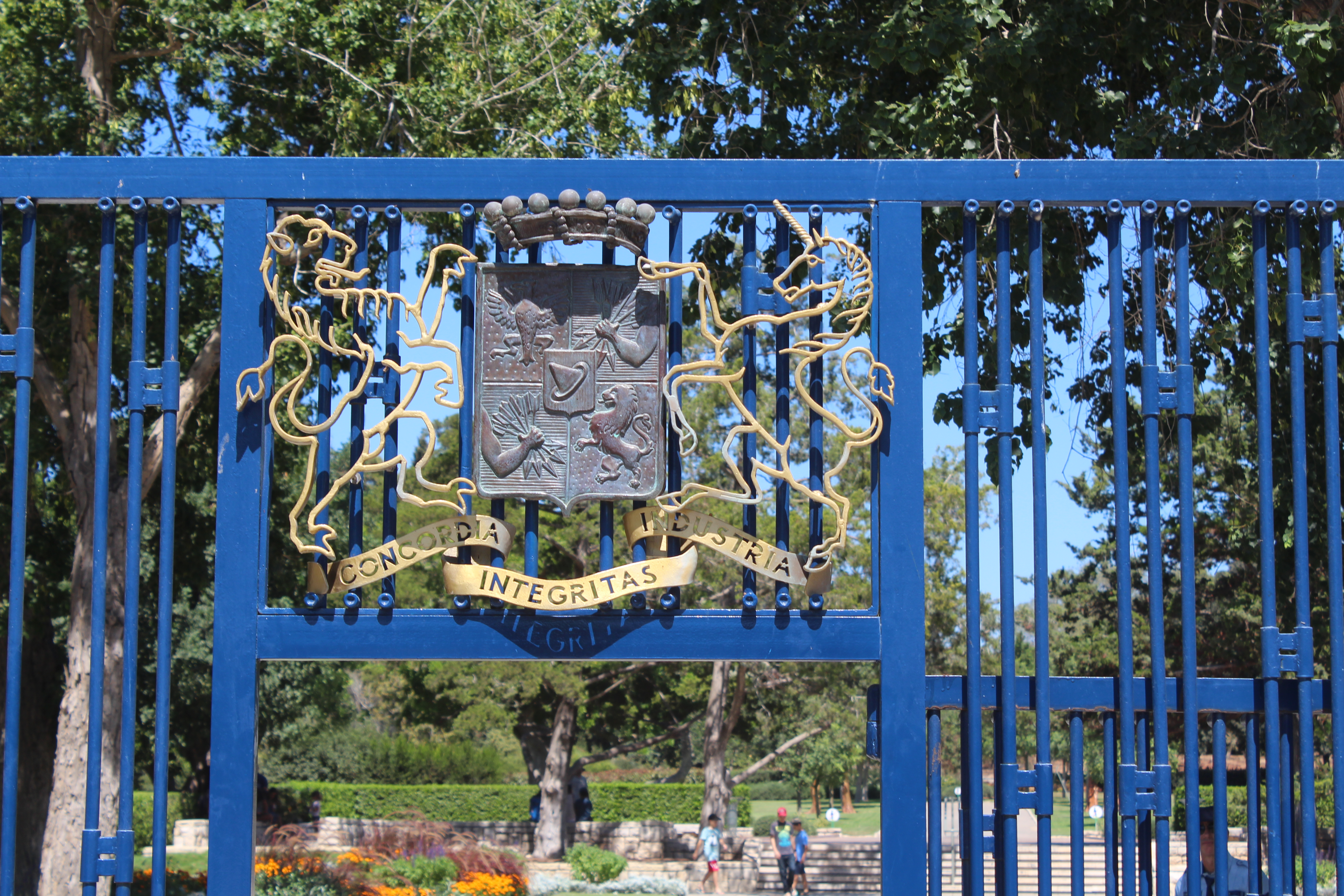
- Formation: 1958; 68 years ago
- Founder: Rothschild family
- Type: Non-profit
- Headquarters: Israel
- Services: Education, environment, academic excellence, support for the Arab community

Yad Hanadiv (Rothschild Foundation) is a Rothschild family philanthropic foundation in Israel. The foundation engages in activities intended to advance various aspects of Israeli society, including public institutions and environmental initiatives. Its work is grounded in the Rothschild family's longstanding tradition of philanthropy in Israel. The foundation states that its activity is guided by principles of democracy, equality, inclusion, excellence, and social responsibility.

== Goals and objectives ==
Yad Hanadiv defines its vision as: "Yad Hanadiv works to enhance Israel's society, institutions, and environment, for the benefit of all. Rooted in centuries of Rothschild family leadership, the Foundation champions democratic values, equality, inclusion, excellence, and shared responsibility. With bold vision and transformative partnerships, we strive to create meaningful change towards a better future for all the inhabitants of Israel."

Yad Hanadiv's support is focused on the areas of education, environment, academic excellence, early childhood, and Arab community. It funds and operates Ramat Hanadiv Memorial Gardens and Nature Park and is participating in renewal of the National Library of Israel, including the construction of a state-of-the-art, 21st-century National Library for the State of Israel. Initiatives include advancing precision medicine in Israel, promoting humanities research and teaching, upgrading teachers' professional development, Arab employment, advancing excellent Arab students in Science and Technology, advancing marine ecosystems and river rehabilitation.

== History ==
Yad Hanadiv commemorates Baron Edmond James de Rothschild ("Hanadiv Hayadua" – “The well-known benefactor”), and continues the spirit and legacy of the Rothschild Family. The Foundation was established in its current form in 1958. Its first chairperson was Dorothy de Rothschild, who served in this position until 1988. In 1989 Lord Jacob Rothschild was appointed chair. In 2018, the Hon. Dame Hannah Rothschild DBE CBE assumed the position of chair and Lord Rothschild became Yad Hanadiv's president, a role he held until his death in 2024. The Foundation is guided by a Board of Trustees led by the Rothschild family. As of 2025, the Chief Executive of the Foundation is Professor Yigal Mersel.

== Projects ==
=== Past projects ===
Yad Hanadiv was instrumental in the construction of the Knesset building and the Supreme Court of Israel, and in the establishment of Israeli Educational Television, The Open University, The Centre for Educational Technology, Centre for Science Education (HEMDA), MANOF Youth Village, The Jerusalem Music Centre at Mishkenot Sha’ananim, The Institute for Advanced Studies, The Water Research Institute at the Technion, The Environment and Health Fund, The Israel Institute for School Leadership (Avney Rosha), the GuideStar Israel database of non-profit organizations, and other institutions.

=== Ongoing projects ===
- The Academic Excellence Programme aims to nurture a diverse group of outstanding individuals in the sciences and arts, and to enhanceing the impact of academic excellence on Israeli society.
- The Environment Programme workes to improve the health and resilience of ecological systems, in natural, agricultural and urban areas, for the benefit of people and nature.
- The Early Childhood Programme focuses on raising the quality of care for infants and preschool children from lower socio-economic backgrounds and high-risk populations.
- The Arab Community Programme is dedicated to supporting the integration of young Arab women and men into the Israeli economy and society.
- The Education Programme strives to support quality formal and informal educational opportunities for elementary and middle- school children from lower socio-economic backgrounds.

== Prizes and Fellowships ==
The Foundation grants prizes and fellowships through several programmes:

- The Rothschild Prize, awarded biennially in recognition of original and outstanding published work in Mathematics/Computer Sciences and Engineering, Chemical Sciences and Physical Sciences, Life Sciences, Jewish Studies, Humanities, Social Sciences and the Arts.
- The Rothschild Fellowship awarded to outstanding young researchers who seek to pursue postdoctoral studies outside Israel.
- The Rothschild Prize in Education in memory of Max Rowe.
- The Michael Bruno Memorial Award launched in 1999 to encourage outstanding researchers at the beginning of their scientific careers, was granted directly by Yad Hanadiv between 1999 and 2011 to promising researchers who had achieved exceptional distinction in their fields. Since 2002,the award has been conferred by the Israel Institute for Advanced Studies at The Hebrew University of Jerusalem, with the ongoing support of Yad Hanadiv.

== National Library of Israel ==
Yad Hanadiv's support for the National Library renewal includes funding, for construction of the new National Library building on a triangular plot facing the Knesset building, which was donated by the Israeli government. The new building, which opened its doors to the public in 2023, was designed by the Swiss firm of Herzog & de Meuron.
