= Theo Grace =

Jewelry line co-founded by Nicky Hilton

- Company type: Private
- Industry: Jewelry
- Founder: Nicky Hilton
- Area served: Worldwide
- Products: Jewelry
- Website: www.theograce.com

Theo Grace (formerly MYKA) is a jewelry line co-founded by Nicky Hilton. It originated as MyNameNecklace in 2006. It operates in more than 30 countries and produces custom necklaces, bracelets, rings, and earrings.

== History ==
Theo Grace was originally launched as MyNameNecklace in 2006, but was renamed as MYKA in 2021.

It was renamed as Theo Grace again in 2025. The name combines co-founder Nicky Hilton's daughters’ names, Theodora and Lily Grace.

== Products and collections ==
Theo Grace offers customizable fine jewelry in sterling silver, gold vermeil, and diamond-studded styles. Styles include name necklaces, initial pendants, birthstone, and diamond jewelry. Nicky Hilton x Theo Grace – Charmed Collection contains signature pieces curated by Hilton.

Theo Grace incorporates lab-grown diamonds in select pieces.

== See also ==
- Nicky Hilton
- Oak & Luna
