= Baron Rothschild =

Title in the Peerage of the United Kingdom

- Quarterly: 1st, Or an eagle displayed Sable langued Gules; 2nd, Azure issuing from the sinister flank an arm embowed proper grasping five arrows points downward Argent; 3rd, Azure issuing from the dexter flank an arm embowed proper grasping five arrows points downward Argent; 4th, Or a Lion rampant Gules; over all an escutcheon Gules charged with an oval target with pointed center Argent per bend sinister
- Creation date: 29 June 1885
- Created by: Queen Victoria
- Peerage: Peerage of the United Kingdom
- First holder: Sir Nathan Rothschild, Bt
- Present holder: Nathaniel Rothschild
- Remainder to: Heirs male of the body of the first baron; failing, heirs male of the sons of the first baron's brother
- Seat: Eythrope
- Former seat: Tring Park Mansion
- Motto: Concordia, Integritas, Industria (Latin for 'Harmony, Integrity, Industry')

Baron Rothschild, of Tring in the County of Hertfordshire, is a title in the Peerage of the United Kingdom. It was created in 1885 for Sir Nathan Rothschild, 2nd Baronet, a member of the Rothschild banking family. He was the first Jewish member of the House of Lords not to have previously converted to Christianity. The current holder of the title is Nathaniel Rothschild, 5th Baron Rothschild, who inherited the barony in February 2024.

== History ==
The Rothschild baronetcy, of Grosvenor Place, was created in the Baronetage of the United Kingdom in 1847 for Anthony de Rothschild, a banker and politician, with remainder to the male issue of his elder brother, Lionel de Rothschild, the first ever practicing Jewish Member of Parliament. Both Anthony and Lionel were sons of the influential financier Nathan Mayer Rothschild (1777–1836), founder of the English branch of the Rothschild family.

The first Baronet was succeeded according to the special remainder by his nephew, the aforementioned second Baronet, who was created Baron Rothschild in 1885. Although other ethnic Jews such as Sampson Eardley and Benjamin Disraeli had already received peerages, both were brought up as Christians from childhood, and Eardley's Irish peerage did not entitle him to a seat in the House of Lords. Rothschild was thus the first practicing Jew to sit in the House of Lords.

He was succeeded by his eldest son, Walter, the second Baron. He was a banker and politician but is best remembered for his interest in zoology. He died without male issue and his brother had predeceased him, so upon his death, the titles passed to his nephew Victor, the third Baron. He was the only son of the Hon. Charles Rothschild.

As of 2024, the titles are held by the fourth Baron's son, Nathaniel, the fifth Baron, who succeeded in 2024.

=== Austrian title ===
In 1822, the hereditary title of Freiherr (baron) of the Austrian Empire was granted in the Austrian nobility by Emperor Francis I of Austria to the five sons of Mayer Amschel Rothschild. In 1838, Queen Victoria authorized the use of this Austrian baronial title in the United Kingdom by Lionel de Rothschild and certain other members of the Rothschild family. However, the use of such foreign titles in the United Kingdom was subsequently limited by a warrant of 27 April 1932.

=== Rothschild baronets, of Grosvenor Place (1847) ===
Arms of the Rothschild baronets

- Sir Anthony Nathan de Rothschild, 1st Baronet (1810–1876)
- Sir Nathan Mayer Rothschild, 2nd Baronet (1840–1915) (created Baron Rothschild in 1885)

=== Baron Rothschild (1885) ===
- Nathan Mayer Rothschild, 1st Baron Rothschild (1840–1915)
- Lionel Walter Rothschild, 2nd Baron Rothschild (1868–1937)
- Nathaniel Mayer Victor Rothschild, 3rd Baron Rothschild (1910–1990)
- Nathaniel Charles Jacob Rothschild, 4th Baron Rothschild (1936–2024)
- Nathaniel Philip Victor James Rothschild, 5th Baron Rothschild (born 1971)

The 5th Baron has a son with his wife, whose name and age the couple have not publicly revealed. The son will be the heir apparent if born in wedlock. If not, the heir presumptive will be the present holder's first cousin, James Rothschild (born 1985), who in turn has a son Chasen, born in 2022.

There are no other living male-line descendants of the first Baron. If the line of the first Baron fails, the barony will become extinct, but the baronetcy will fall to a descendant of the first Baron's younger brother, Leopold de Rothschild (1845–1917). That descendant is currently his great-grandson Nicholas David Rothschild (born 1951).

=== Title succession chart ===
Title succession chart, Rothschild baronets and Barons Rothschild

Nathan Mayer Rothschild; 1777–1836
Rothschild baronetcy
Lionel de Rothschild; 1808–1879	Sir Anthony de Rothschild; 1st Baronet; 1810–1876
Baron Rothschild
Nathan Rothschild; 1st Baron Rothschild; 2nd Baronet; 1840–1915
Walter Rothschild; 2nd Baron Rothschild; 3rd Baronet; 1868–1937	Hon. Charles Rothschild; 1877–1923
Victor Rothschild; 3rd Baron Rothschild; 4th Baronet; 1910–1990
Jacob Rothschild; 4th Baron Rothschild; 5th Baronet; 1936–2024	Benjamin Rothschild; 1952–1952	Hon. Amschel Rothschild; 1955–1996
Nathaniel Rothschild; 5th Baron Rothschild; 6th Baronet born 1971	James Rothschild born 1985

=== Line of succession ===
Those in positions (4) to (9) below are in remainder to the baronetcy only.

- Nathan Mayer Rothschild (1777–1836)
  - Lionel Nathan de Rothschild (1808–1879)
    - Nathan Mayer de Rothschild, 1st Baron Rothschild, 2nd Baronet (1840–1915)
      - (Lionel) Walter Rothschild, 2nd Baron Rothschild, 3rd Baronet (1868–1937)
      - Hon. (Nathaniel) Charles Rothschild (1877–1923)
        - (Nathaniel Mayer) Victor Rothschild, 3rd Baron Rothschild, 4th Baronet (1910–1990)
          - (Nathaniel Charles) Jacob Rothschild, 4th Baron Rothschild, 5th Baronet (1936–2024)
            - Nathaniel Philip Victor James Rothschild, 5th Baron Rothschild, 6th Baronet (born 1971)
              - (1) Son (unknown name) (born 2025)
          - Hon. Amschel Mayor James Rothschild (1955–1996)
            - (2) James Amschel Victor Rothschild (born 1985)
              - (3) Chasen Rothschild (born 2022)
    - Leopold de Rothschild (1845–1917)
      - Lionel Nathan de Rothschild (1882–1942)
        - Edmund Leopold de Rothschild (1916–2009)
          - (4) Nicholas David Rothschild (born 1951)
          - (5) David Lionel Rothschild (born 1955)
            - (6) Leopold James Rothschild (born 1994)
            - (7) Amschel Nathaniel Rothschild (born 1995)
      - Anthony Gustav de Rothschild (1887–1961)
        - Sir Evelyn Robert Adrian de Rothschild (1931–2022)
          - (8) Anthony James de Rothschild (born 1977)
          - (9) David Mayer de Rothschild (born 1978)
  - Sir Anthony Nathan de Rothschild, 1st Baronet (1810–1876)
