= Oak & Luna =

American jewelry company

- Company type: Private
- Industry: Jewelry
- Founded: 2018
- Area served: Worldwide
- Products: Jewelry
- Website: www.oakandluna.com

Oak & Luna is an American jewelry company that creates necklaces, bracelets, and rings. Established in 2018, the company specializes in custom jewelry.

== Overview ==
Oak & Luna was founded in 2018 in the United States. The company later expanded to European by launching a French-language website.

Oak & Luna focuses on "elevated" custom jewelry using materials such as gold vermeil, 10k and 14k solid gold, sterling silver, rose gold, white gold, and lab diamonds. Primary styles include nameplate necklaces, initial necklaces, and diamond jewelry. Some of their items include the Willow Tag Initial Necklace, Belle Name Necklace, The Singapore Chain, Compass Necklace, and the Inez Initial Necklace.

== Collaborations ==
Oak & Luna has engaged in several collaborations with fashion and jewelry designers. In 2023, the brand collaborated with Ukrainian and London-based fashion designer Natasha Zinko.

In 2025, Oak & Luna launched the "ALL HOURS" collection in collaboration with New York-based jewelry designer Stephanie Gottlieb. The collection featured necklaces and earrings, including the "My Signature Initial" design. Media coverage noted this debut collaboration included fine jewelry elements.

== See also ==
- Theo Grace
