= Mandelson: The Real PM? =

2010 British film directed by Hannah Rothschild

- Directed by: Hannah Rothschild
- Produced by: Hannah Rothschild
- Edited by: Oliver Huddleston
- Music by: David Ogilvy
- Production company: Clandestine Films
- Release dates: 24 October 2010 (BFI London Film Festival); 23 November 2010 (BBC Four)
- Running time: 75 minutes
- Country: United Kingdom
- Language: English

Mandelson: The Real PM? is a 2010 British documentary film directed by Hannah Rothschild.

== Synopsis ==
The film follows the politician Peter Mandelson as he orchestrates the Labour Party's campaign for the 2010 United Kingdom general election. It was edited from 250 hours of footage, recorded during eight months until June 2010.

== Release ==
The film premiered on 24 October 2010 at the BFI London Film Festival. It was broadcast on BBC Four on 23 November 2010 as part of the documentary strand Storyville.

== Reception ==
Time Out called it "an intensely fun film to watch" and wrote that Mandelson must be considered its co-author, out to control his public image, which is "not a criticism of the film; it simply lends it another layer of interest". The Independent compared it to the 1960 film Primary, which showed John F. Kennedy off duty, but wrote that "with Mandelson, there are no off-duty moments". Screen Daily described it as "somewhere between an intimate portrait of the figure formerly dubbed The Prince of Darkness and a compelling look at the nature of power", shot with "a jumpiness which doesn't make this documentary an aesthetically comfortable view".
