= Mauger (French name) =

Family name

Mauger is a Norman surname of Germanic origin (possibly meaning 'council-spear'). It was used first as a given name in the Middle Ages. pronunciation API : French [moʒe] (Old French [maʷdʒɘʁ]); English [ˈmeɪ.dʒ.ə(ɹ)].

== Etymology ==
The second element of the name -ger is from Germanic gari "spear" (see Roger, Gerard, etc.), while the first element Mau-, is a short form for Madal-, which is ultimately from Germanic *maþl- "assembly, council" (Old High German mahal, Anglo-Saxon mæðl "council, assembly"). The Old Norman form was Malger. In fact, it could recover an Old Scandinavian given name, like many other Norman first names (Anfray, Angot, etc.) in the Middle Ages. The Old Norse form for madal was mál "speech, law-suit" and the given name was perhaps *Málgeir, which has survived as Málgeir in Icelandic, if it is not a new created name. The Old Danish nickname Malti could be related to it, as a short form of the Germanic names beginning with Madal-. The given name Malte originates from it.

In the old documents, it was Latinized different ways such as Maugerius, Malgerius, Maldegarius, Madalgarius. Old French Malger and Middle French Maugier are often found.

== Historical sources ==
*Madalgari- belongs to a large family of Germanic given names beginning with Madal- we find in Latin documents dating back the Merovingians and the reign of Charlemagne : Madalgaudus, Madalcarius, Madalgis, Madalberta, Madalgudis.

Mauger (archbishop of Rouen) in the eleventh century, had a half-brother Robert I of Normandy who was the father of William the Conqueror. Archbishop Mauger was exiled to Guernsey, with his family, where he finally drowned himself because he was drunk.

In England, one Hugo filius Malgeri (Norman *Hugh Fitz Malger) appears in the Domesday Book of Essex in 1086, a short time after the Conquest, while Malger filius Gilleberti (Norman *Malger Fitz G(u)ilbert) is mentioned later in 1150. As a surname, it first appears in the mid 13th Century, while other recordings include John Malger, mentioned in the Assize Court Rolls of Somerset in 1272, and a certain Thomas Mauger, recorded in the Cartulary of Oseney Abbey (Oxford) in 1260. The first recorded modern spelling of the family name is shown to be that of John Mauger, which was dated 1250, in the Feet of Fines of Somerset, during the reign of Henry III of England, known as "The Frenchman".

== Repartition and usage ==
Besides continental Normandy, the surname Mauger is frequently found in insular Normandy, in other words the Channel Islands, particularly Guernsey and Jersey. The surname first reached England following its conquest by the Normans in 1066. There and in the rest of the Commonwealth, the name Mauger is usually pronounced "Major", rather than retaining a French pronunciation.

Other Maugers include two New Zealand sportsmen, Ivan Mauger who was six times the motorcycle speedway world champion and his great-nephew, Aaron Mauger who made his All Blacks debut in 2001. Another is Samuel Mauger, a former Australian politician originating in Guernsey.

Mauger bleu is also a popular French grammar textbook, used all over the world (full title: Cours de Langue et de Civilisation Françaises, tomes I-IV, by Gaston Mauger).

== Toponymy ==
- Bosc-Mauger, hamlet at Yerville, Upper Normandy
- Hameau Mauger, hamlet at Foucarville, Lower Normandy
- Lawarde-Mauger-l'Hortoy (Picardy)
- Maugerville, Canada
- Le Mesnil-Mauger (Lower Normandy)
- Mesnil-Mauger (Upper Normandy, Mesnil Mauger in 1210)
- Saint-Ouen-le-Mauger (Upper Normandy, Sanctus Audoenus le Maugier 12th century)

== See also ==
- Mauger (disambiguation)
- Mayor (surname)
