= Serena Rothschild =

British racehorse owner (1935–2019)

The Right Honourable The Lady Rothschild
- Born: Serena Mary Dunn; 28 April 1934; Marylebone, London
- Died: 13 January 2019 (aged 84); London, England
- Occupation: Thoroughbred racehorse owner
- Spouse: Jacob Rothschild, 4th Baron Rothschild (m. 1961)
- Children: 4, including Hannah Rothschild and Nathaniel Philip Rothschild
- Relatives: Nell Dunn (sister); James Hamet Dunn (grandfather); Annabelle Neilson (former daughter-in-law)

Serena Mary Rothschild, Baroness Rothschild (née Dunn; 28 April 1934 – 13 January 2019) was a British Thoroughbred racehorse owner and the wife of Jacob Rothschild, 4th Baron Rothschild.

== Early life ==
Rothschild was born in 1934, the eldest child of Sir Philip Gordon Dunn, Bt., and Lady Mary Sybil St. Clair-Erskine (daughter of James St Clair-Erskine, 5th Earl of Rosslyn). Her sister is the writer Nell Dunn. Her paternal grandfather was Sir James Dunn, Bt., a prominent Canadian industrialist. Her parents divorced in 1944 and remarried each other in 1969.

== Thoroughbred racing ==
Rothschild oversaw the management of Waddesdon Stud at Waddesdon Manor in Buckinghamshire. In November 2006, she paid 3 million guineas for the mare Spinning Queen, then a world record price (for a filly or broodmare) of 4.6 million guineas when she purchased Magical Romance at the Tattersalls sale.

In 2009, her colt Pounced, trained by John Gosden and ridden by Frankie Dettori, won the Breeders' Cup Juvenile Turf at Santa Anita Park in Arcadia, California. In 2011, her colt Nathaniel won the King Edward VII Stakes (G2) at Ascot and the King George VI and Queen Elizabeth Stakes (G1), also at Ascot. In 2012, she won the Eclipse Stakes (G1) with Nathaniel, The Lancashire Oaks (G2), and then the Irish Oaks (Classic G1) with Great Heavens.

== Personal life ==
On 20 October 1961 in Devizes, Wiltshire, she married Nathaniel Charles Jacob Rothschild (later the 4th Baron Rothschild), an investment banker who was a birth member of the Rothschild banking family of England as the eldest son to Victor Rothschild, 3rd Baron Rothschild and his first wife, Barbara Judith (née Hutchinson). Together, they had four children, consisting of three daughters and a son. Their children were;

- The Hon. Hannah Mary Rothschild (born 22 May 1962), a film maker. She married William Lord Brookfield, an American filmmaker, in 1994, they had three daughters together, and were divorced in 2000.
- The Hon. Beth Matilda Rothschild (born 27 February 1964). She married Antonio Tomassini in 1991, they had three children together, and later divorced.
- The Hon. Emily Magda Rothschild (born 19 December 1967). She married Julian Freeman-Attwood on 25 June 1998 and they had two daughters together. They split in 2016.
- The Right Honourable Nathaniel Philip Victor James Rothschild, 5th Baron Rothschild (born 12 July 1971), a financier. He eloped to Las Vegas with Annabelle Neilson, a socialite, on 13 November 1995 and they were divorced in 1998. He married Loretta Victoria Basey, a former Page 3 model for The Sun, in Klosters on 23 July 2016.

The couple made their home at Pewsey, Wiltshire, and maintained a villa on the Greek island of Corfu. She and her husband were involved in a number of charitable and humanitarian organisations, and she was a Vice President of the Wiltshire Blind Association.

Lady Rothschild died in a London hospital on 13 January 2019, having "fought a recent illness most valiantly". She was 84.
