= Mauger =

Mauger may refer to:

- Mauger (French name), a Norman surname
- Mauger (Jamaican Patois term), a term used in rural Jamaica for a thin woman

== People with the given name ==
- Mauger of Hauteville (died 1050s), son of Tancred of Hauteville
- Mauger (archbishop of Rouen) (c. 1019–1055), son of Richard II, Duke of Normandy
- Mauger, Count of Corbeil, 11th century Norman, son of Richard I of Normandy
- Mauger, Count of Troina (died after 1098), son of Roger I of Sicily
- Mauger of Worcester (died 1212), bishop of Worcester

== People with the surname ==
- Aaron Mauger (born 1980), New Zealand rugby union player
- Ivan Mauger (1939–2018), New Zealand former world motorcycle speedway champion
- Jacques Mauger (born 1959), French trombone player
- Nathan Mauger (born 1978), New Zealand rugby union player
- Quincy Mauger (born 1995), American football player
- Samuel Mauger (1857–1936), Australian politician

== See also ==
- Le Mesnil-Mauger, a commune in the Calvados department, France
