= Teresa Rothschild =

British counter-intelligence officer and magistrate

The Right Honourable The Lady Rothschild MBE, JP
- Born: Teresa Georgina Mayor; 10 September 1915; London, England
- Died: 29 May 1996 (aged 80); London, England
- Education: Bedales School
- Alma mater: Newnham College, Cambridge
- Occupations: counter-intelligence officer magistrate
- Spouse: Victor Rothschild, 3rd Baron Rothschild (m. 1946; died 1990)
- Children: 4, including Emma Rothschild and Amschel Rothschild
- Relatives: Joseph Bickersteth Mayor; F. M. Mayor; John Grote; Richard Meinertzhagen; Beatrice Webb

Teresa Georgina Rothschild, Baroness Rothschild (née Mayor; 10 September 1915 – 29 May 1996) was a British counter-intelligence officer and magistrate. She was the second wife of Victor Rothschild, 3rd Baron Rothschild.

== Early life ==
She was born Teresa Georgina Mayor in London on 10 September 1915, the daughter of Robert John Grote Mayor (1869–1947), a civil servant working for the Board of Education, and his wife, (Katherine) Beatrice Mayor, née Meinertzhagen (1885–1971), a poet and playwright.

Her paternal grandfather was Joseph Bickersteth Mayor, brother of John E. B. Mayor and nephew of Henry Bickersteth, 1st Baron Langdale and Rev. Edward Bickersteth. Her father was the brother of English novelist F. M. Mayor and a great-nephew of the historian George Grote, philosopher John Grote, and colonial administrator Arthur Grote. Her maternal grandmother, Katherine Beatrice Meinertzhagen, was the sister of soldier Richard Meinertzhagen and the niece of author Beatrice Webb.

She was educated at Bedales School from 1929 to 1934, and was head girl, followed in 1935 by Newnham College, Cambridge, where she was "the most celebrated actress of her day".

== Career ==
After Cambridge, she worked for the publisher Jonathan Cape. During the Second World War, she was recruited by MI5 to work as assistant to Victor Rothschild, 3rd Baron Rothschild, working in anti-sabotage operations.

She became a magistrate, and was Chairman of the Bench, and was a lecturer at the Cambridge Institute of Criminology, and she sat on various Home Office boards investigating the subject of penal reform. She was a trustee of Cambridge's Arts Theatre.

== Personal life ==
On 14 August 1946, she married Victor Rothschild, 3rd Baron Rothschild, her boss in MI5, and they had two sons (one died in infancy) and two daughters together.

- Emma Georgina Rothschild (born 1948), married the economist Amartya Sen (born 1933) in 1991
- Benjamin Mayer Rothschild (born and died 1952)
- Victoria Katherine Rothschild (born 1953), lecturer at Queen Mary, University of London, and the second wife of the writer Simon Gray (1936–2008)
- Amschel Mayor James Rothschild (1955–1996), married to Anita Patience Guinness, worked for N.M. Rothschild & Sons, and killed himself in 1996

== Later life ==
Rothschild died on 29 May 1996 in London, and was survived by her two daughters, both of whom pursued academic careers, and a son, who entered the Rothschild banking business.
