= Rothschild Fellowship =

- Awarded for: Excellence in their field(s)
- Country: Israel
- Presented by: Yad Hanadiv (The Rothschild Foundation)
- First award: 1979; 47 years ago
- Website: Rothschild Fellows

The Rothschild Fellowship program is a grant awarded annually by Yad Hanadiv (The Rothschild Foundation).

The Rothschild Scholarship for Outstanding Young Researchers is an awarded since 1979 with the aim of helping outstanding young researchers with exceptional potential to advance in the field of scientific practice. The candidates must have received a PhD from a university in Israel.

The generous Rothschild scholarships are awarded to postgraduate students who wish to pursue postdoctoral studies outside of Israel. According to the Yad Hanadiv website: Most of the scholarship recipients have been integrated into academic institutions in Israel, among them they have gained a leading status in their field and some of them even hold academic leadership positions in Israel.

== Categories ==
The scholarships are awarded in the fields of natural sciences, exact sciences, life sciences, humanities and social sciences and in the study of the brain, consciousness and language.

== See also ==
- Yad Hanadiv
- Lady Davis Fellows
