= Nathaniel Rothschild, 5th Baron Rothschild =

British-born Canadian financier (born 1971)

The Right Honourable The Lord Rothschild
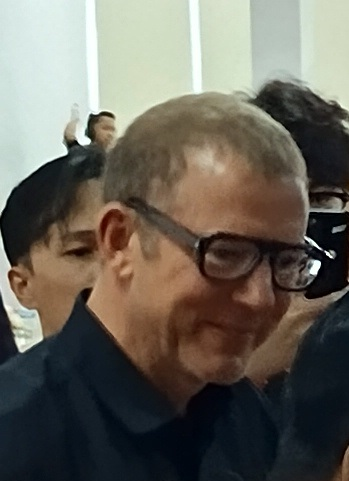
- Rothschild in 2024
- Born: Nathaniel Philip Victor James Rothschild; 12 July 1971 (age 55); London, England
- Citizenship: Canada; Montenegro; Switzerland
- Education: Wadham College, Oxford; King's College London
- Occupation: Financier
- Years active: 1989–present
- Spouses: Annabelle Neilson (m. 1995; div. 1998) (Note: Most sources incorrectly report the Rothschild–Neilson marriage to have been between 1994 and 1997.) Loretta Basey (m. 2016)
- Partner: Eliza Cummings (2012–2014)
- Children: 1
- Parents: Jacob Rothschild, 4th Baron Rothschild (father); Serena Rothschild, Baroness Rothschild (mother)
- Relatives: Hannah Rothschild (sister); Nell Dunn (aunt)
- Family: Rothschild banking family of England

Nathaniel "Nat" Philip Victor James Rothschild, 5th Baron Rothschild (born 12 July 1971) is a financier and hereditary peer of the United Kingdom, who is a member of the Rothschild banking family of England. While Rothschild was born and grew up in England; he also holds Canadian, Swiss and Montenegrin citizenship.

Rothschild became the 5th Baron Rothschild on the death of his father, on 26 February 2024.

== Early life ==
Rothschild was born Nathaniel Philip Victor James Rothschild in Paddington, Greater London, England, on 12 July 1971, as the youngest child and only son to Jacob Rothschild, 4th Baron Rothschild, a member of the Rothschild banking family of England, and his wife, Serena Rothschild, Baroness Rothschild (née Dunn). He has three sisters: Hannah Rothschild (formerly Brookfield), Beth Matilda Rothschild (formerly Tomassini) and Emily Magda "Emmy" Freeman-Attwood (née Rothschild).

=== Family ===
Rothschild's mother came from a Christian background, while his father was Jewish. Rothschild's paternal grandfather, Victor Rothschild, 3rd Baron Rothschild, was born into a Jewish family, while his paternal grandmother, Barbara Judith Rothschild (née Hutchinson; 1911–1989), converted to Judaism upon marriage. His maternal grandparents were Lady Mary Sybil St. Clair-Erskine, daughter of James St Clair-Erskine, 5th Earl of Rosslyn and Vera Mary St Clair-Erskine, Countess of Rosslyn, and Sir Philip Gordon Dunn, 2nd Baronet, the only son of the Canadian financier and tycoon Sir James Hamet Dunn, 1st Baronet.

=== Education ===
Rothschild attended Colet Court (in the same year as the former Chancellor of the Exchequer, George Osborne), Eton College and finally Wadham College, Oxford, where he studied history, earning an upper second. At Oxford, he was a member of the Bullingdon Club, an exclusive and controversial drinking society as an undergraduate, at the same time as Osborne.

He completed a MSc degree in Addiction Studies at the Institute of Psychiatry, King's College London, in 2013. He was elected as a foundation fellow of Wadham College, Oxford, in 2018.

== Career ==
Rothschild joined the fund manager Lazard after graduating, and then went to work at Gleacher & Co., a corporate finance firm. In 2000, he occupied a variety of positions, and holds a 50% stake in NR Atticus, Atticus Management and Atticus Capital, a hedge fund, which in 2000, controlled funds approaching £312M.

He is the former chairman of Vivarte, a pan-European retailer and owner of the Kookai clothing brand. Appointed in 2000, following NR Atticus's acquisition of a 32.9% stake in what was widely regarded as the first hostile proxy fight in France, he led the group through its successful restructuring and subsequent sale to PAI Partners, a French private equity firm in 2004.

He became an alternate director of RIT Capital Partners plc in March 2000, and a full non-executive director in 2004 until 2010, when he stepped down from the RIT board. He remains a substantial direct shareholder of RIT and a 35% beneficial shareholder of Five Arrows Limited, a Rothschild holding company whose major asset is shares in RIT.

Rothschild is a former member of the Belfer Center's International Council at Harvard's John F. Kennedy School of Government and the International Advisory Council of the Brookings Institution. He was also a member of the International Advisory Board of the Barrick Gold Corporation until 2013.

Rothschild hosted an event for Saif al-Islam Gaddafi, the son of former Libyan leader Muammar Gaddafi in 2008.

In October 2008, Rothschild was the subject of much press speculation when it was revealed that Labour politician Peter Mandelson and the Russian aluminium tycoon, Oleg Deripaska (RUSAL) had met when staying on a yacht moored near Corfu, in order to attend a party held by Rothschild. After speculation that this might constitute a conflict of interest for Mandelson, Rothschild wrote a letter to The Times newspaper alleging that another guest was Conservative Shadow Chancellor of the Exchequer George Osborne, who, he said, illicitly tried to solicit a donation from Deripaska for his party.

In February 2012, Rothschild lost his libel case with the Daily Mail tabloid newspaper, who had accused him of being a "puppet master" in reporting about his foreign trips with Mandelson.

He has been the chairman of Volex plc, a UK-listed manufacturer, since November 2015.

In November 2020, amid the COVID-19 pandemic, he was accused of refusing to help his clients.

== Investments ==
In March 2000, The Observer wrote that, in addition to Rothschild's then declared inheritance of GB£500M, his actual inheritance was "hidden in a series of trusts in Switzerland and rumoured to be worth GB£40bn". Via NR Investments Ltd., his principal investment company, he was a cornerstone investment in the United Company RUSAL initial public offering in January 2010. At the same time, he bought US$40M of Glencore bonds convertible into shares upon an IPO.

NR Investments is also the largest shareholder (26.5% as of 2009) of Volex. Furthermore, he has an interest in various property developments in Eastern Europe (Montenegro, Romania and Ukraine). In October 2023, Volex was targeted by hackers.

In July 2010, Vallar plc, a Jersey-incorporated investment vehicle run by Rothschild and James Campbell, raised GB£707.2M in an initial public offering on the London Stock Exchange.

In November 2010, Vallar announced it was buying stakes for US$3B in two listed Indonesia thermal coal (used for power stations) producers for a combination of cash and new Vallar shares, with a view to combining them to create the largest exporter of thermal coal to China, India, and the other emerging economies of Asia. The transaction closed as planned on 8 April 2011 and Vallar plc was renamed Bumi plc in the same month. The deal was handled in a joint venture with the Bakrie family (43%) and Rosan Roeslani (25%). In September 2012, the investigation of possible finance irregularities in its Indonesian arm resulted in a 14% fall in its share price. In October 2012, Rothschild quit the firm's board. In May 2013, the much-delayed financial results for 2012 showed a US$200M black hole. It was also reported, that Roeslani, a former director of the company, had stolen US$173M from it. In December 2013, the company changed its name to Asia Resource Minerals. In June 2015, following a series of disputes with his co-investors, he abandoned his investment in the company, selling his 17.2% stake to Coal Energy Ventures.

In June 2011, Rothschild and Tony Hayward, the former chief executive of BP plc, listed a successor vehicle to Vallar called Vallares on the London Stock Exchange, raising US$2.2B. Essentially, this was identical in every respect to the first vehicle, which was metals and mining focused, except that the new entity would acquire oil and gas assets. In September 2011, Vallares announced a 50/50 all stock merger with Turkish Energy Campion Genel Energy, valued at US$4.2B.

Rothschild announced that he would take a minority stake in Lars Windhorst's investment firm Tennor International and became the company's executive chair in July 2024. In January 2025, he filed a lawsuit against Windhorst, alleging default on a personal loan. The next day, he said he was committed to his partnership with Windhorst, despite the ongoing lawsuit. In August 2025, it was reported that Rothschild had settled with Windhorst. Rothschild was quoted as saying that he had never taken up the planned role of executive chairman and had never made an investment in Tennor.

== Personal life ==
Rothschild and his then-girlfriend, Annabelle Neilson, a socialite and fashion model,—the younger daughter to Maxwell Frederick "Max" Neilson, an investment and property advisor, and his Italian noble wife, Marchesa Elizabetta Maria "Elizabeth" (née Campus [Di] Santinelli), an interior designer—eloped to Las Vegas, Nevada, on 13 November 1995. The couple had been in a relationship since 1991. They first met on a beach in Bali, Indonesia. The couple legally separated, at Neilson's request, in 1997, after less than two years of marriage, and their divorce was finalised in 1998, after less than three years of marriage.

Neilson later told the Daily Mail: "Nat and I had been together for four years and I was 26 when I married him. He first asked me to marry him half an hour after we met and then every day afterwards. Finally, we decided to do it." In 2014, he said: "I find it bizarre that I'm still linked with someone I was involved with literally 20 years ago. On 12 July 2018, Rothschild's 47th birthday, his ex-wife died aged 49 from a heart attack at her home in Chelsea, London. He did not attend her funeral, which took place at St Paul's Church, Knightsbridge on 27 July 2018.

The Irish-bred British-trained Thoroughbred racehorse, Nathaniel (foaled 24 April 2008), winner of the 2011 King George VI and Queen Elizabeth Stakes, was bred and owned by his mother, and is named after Rothschild.

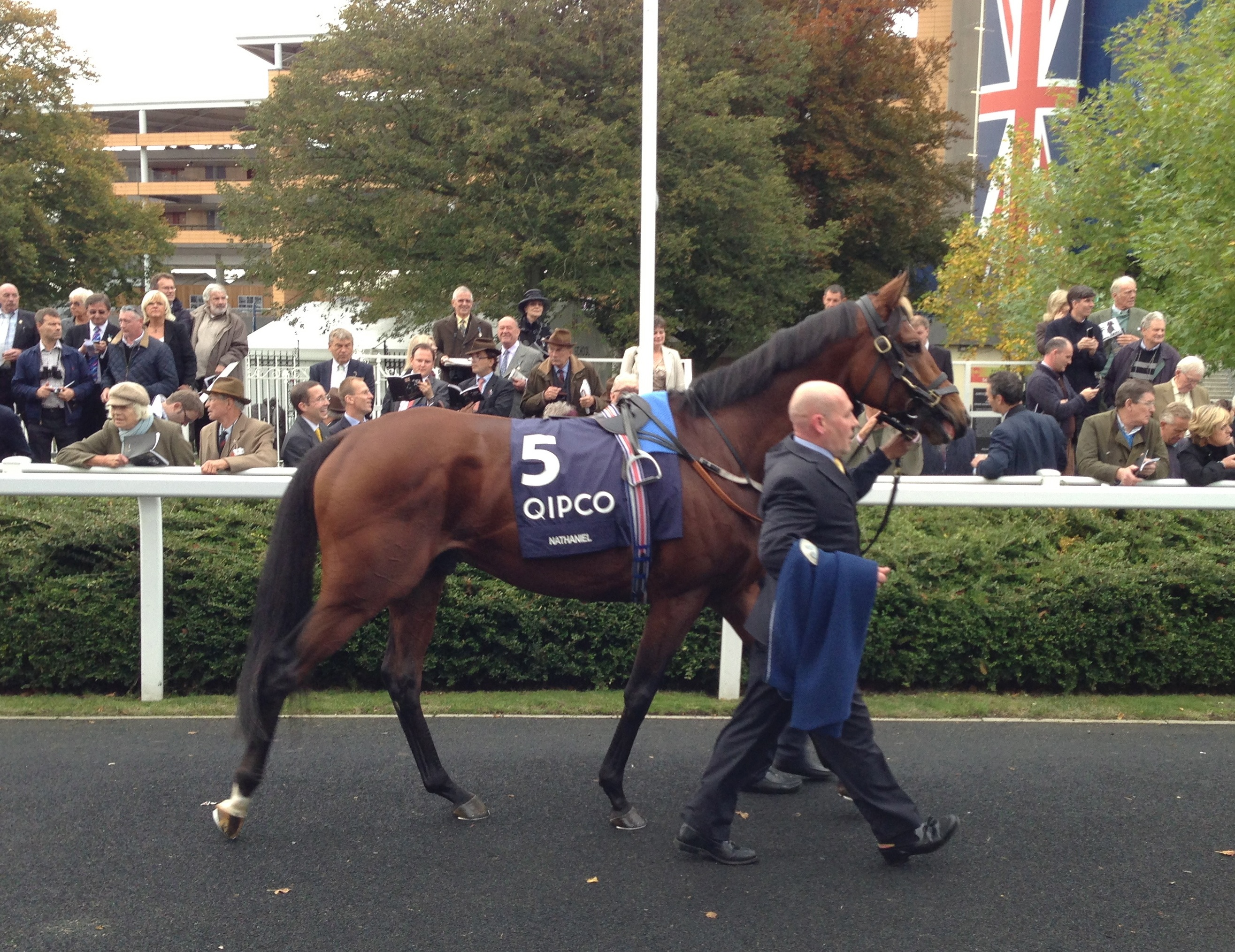
Nathaniel at Ascot before the Champion Stakes in 2012

Rothschild gained a Montenegrin passport on the request of the then Prime Minister of Montenegro, Igor Luksic. He held a three-day party in Montenegro in July 2011, to celebrate his 40th birthday. The party was rumoured to cost a million euros.

He was in a relationship with the model Eliza Cummings from December 2012 to October 2014. The former couple lived together.

He often travels by private jet. The Times reported in 2012 that he owned a £35 million superyacht. Rothschild's four-storey townhouse in New York City's West Village was put up for sale for US $17.5 million in April 2015.

He married his second wife, Loretta Basey, a former glamour model who previously appeared on Page 3 of The Sun tabloid newspaper, at a luxury Swiss ski resort in Klosters, Grisons, on 23 July 2016, having been engaged since December 2015. Basey is 19 years his junior. Their wedding party was held in Stowell Park, Wiltshire, a few weeks after their wedding. His father-in-law is Phillip Victor Basey (born 1956), a chartered accountant, who was one of the three-man team that created UKIP's 2015 general election manifesto and was named as the treasurer of the Brexit Party in 2019. The couple have settled in Switzerland, with their dogs, and divide their time between London, Los Angeles, Florence, Paris, Moscow, New York City, and Greece. In June 2025, it was reported that the couple have a son.

=== Wealth ===
Rothschild's personal wealth has often been documented by The Sunday Times newspaper, making his solo debut to their Rich List in 2009, when he was estimated to be worth £330 million. In 2008, along with his father, their combined wealth was estimated to be £1.4 billion. This was the only year his wealth was combined with a family member. In 2010, The Sunday Times estimated him to be worth £330 million. In 2011, he was estimated to be worth £1 billion, making him a billionaire, and was estimated to be worth the same in 2012. He fell off the list in 2013, following a series of business issues, with some sources reporting his worth to be estimated at £700 million. His fortune kept dropping and in 2016, he was estimated to be worth £70 million.

Rothchild is the owner of the 240-foot superyacht Planet Nine. Launched in 2016, the vessel has a heliport for its MD600 explorer helicopter, and its hull is ice-classified 1D by Lloyd's.

Nathaniel Philip Victor James Rothscild è proprietario dell'immobile denominato "Villa Il Moro" situato in località S. Lorenzo in Collina, nel Comune di Impruneta presso Firenze.Nel 2022 ha iniziato un importante intervento di restauro della Villa sotto la tutela della Soprintendenza delle belle arti di Firenze.https://trasparenza.cultura.gov.it/archivio96_atti-a-rilevanza-esterna-o-provvedimenti-di-tutela-e-valorizzazione_0_80905_950_1.html

Notes

Peerage of the United Kingdom
Preceded by Jacob Rothschild	Baron Rothschild; 2024–present	Incumbent
Baronetage of the United Kingdom
Preceded by Jacob Rothschild	Baronet of Grosvenor Place; 2024–present	Incumbent
