= Arthur Grote =

Arthur Grote (29 November 1814 – 4 December 1886) was an English colonial administrator.

== Life ==
He was born on 29 November 1814 at Beckenham in Kent, England. He was the son of George Grote (1760–1830), a London banker, and Selina Peckwell (1775–1845) who was the daughter of the Rev. Dr Henry Peckwell (1747–1787) and Bella Blosset of Co. Meath, from a well-connected Huguenot family. An elder brother George Grote (1794–1871) became a distinguished politician and historian of Greece, and another brother John Grote was a moral philosopher at Cambridge.

He was educated at Haileybury College, and entered the Bengal Civil Service in 1834, where as a civil servant he was employed in Bengal from 1834 to 1868 and was commissioner and member of the Board of Revenue, Calcutta, 1861–8. He was also served as President of the Asiatic Society of Bengal, 1859–62 and 1865 and President of the Royal Agricultural Society of India.

During his career, Grote helped out his sister-in-law's (Harriet Grote) nephew Thomas Herbert Lewin by helping to advance his administrative career.

On his return to England in 1868, he became a prominent member of the Linnean Society of London and Royal Asiatic Society, and wrote many papers on Natural History subjects. Grote was elected a member of the Society of Arts in 1886.

He died on 4 December 1886 at his house in Ovington Square, London. One of his portraits, painted by Knight, is in the collection of the Asiatic Society, Kolkata.
