= Jacob Rothschild, 4th Baron Rothschild =

English peer, investment banker and philanthropist (1936–2024)

The Right Honourable The Lord Rothschild OM GBE CVO
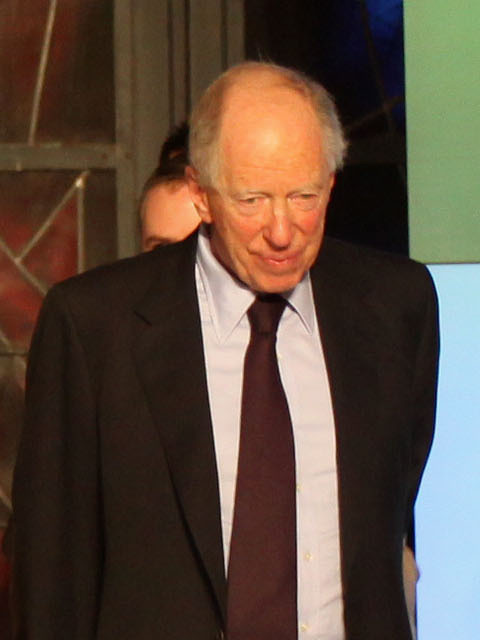
- Rothschild in 2008

Member of the House of Lords
- Lord Temporal
- In office 30 April 1991 – 11 November 1999 as a hereditary peer
- Preceded by: The 3rd Baron Rothschild
- Succeeded by: Seat abolished (Note: Pursuant to the House of Lords Act 1999.)

Personal details
- Born: Nathaniel Charles Jacob Rothschild; 29 April 1936 Cambridge, United Kingdom
- Died: 26 February 2024 (aged 87) London, United Kingdom
- Party: Crossbench (1991–1999)
- Spouse: Serena Dunn (m. 1961; died 2019)
- Children: 4, including Hannah and Nathaniel
- Parent: Victor Rothschild, 3rd Baron Rothschild (father)
- Relatives: Annabelle Neilson (former daughter-in-law)
- Education: Eton College
- Alma mater: Christ Church, Oxford
- Occupation: Banker
- Known for: Rothschild banking family of England
- Awards: See list

Nathaniel Charles Jacob Rothschild, 4th Baron Rothschild (29 April 1936 – 26 February 2024), was a British hereditary peer, investment banker and member of the Rothschild banking family. Rothschild held important roles in business and British public life, and was active in charitable and philanthropic areas.

He was the eldest son of Victor Rothschild, 3rd Baron Rothschild. Raised in a background that intertwined Jewish heritage with the tenets of Orthodox Judaism through his mother's conversion, Rothschild's education spanned from Eton College to Christ Church, Oxford, where he performed well in history. His early life was marked by membership of the Bullingdon Club and familial connections, including half-siblings Emma Rothschild and Amschel Rothschild.

Rothschild's business career started at N M Rothschild & Sons in London, though a familial dispute led to his departure in 1980. Despite relinquishing his stake in the family bank, he maintained influence through the Rothschild Investment Trust, now RIT Capital Partners plc, among other ventures. Notable business activities included founding J. Rothschild Assurance Group with Mark Weinberg and participating in high-profile bids and partnerships. His tenure as Deputy Chairman of BSkyB Television and involvement with RHJ International and Blackstone Inc. highlighted Rothschild's diverse business interests, leading to a Commander of the Royal Victorian Order honour in 2020, for services to the Duchy of Cornwall.

Rothschild was married to Serena Mary Dunn, with whom he had four children, continuing the Rothschild legacy. His philanthropic efforts were extensive, chairing and contributing to art and heritage organizations, notably the National Gallery and the Heritage Lottery Fund in the UK. Rothschild's participation in restoring Waddesdon Manor and engagement with the Butrint Foundation in Albania showed his interest to cultural preservation. His chairmanship of Yad Hanadiv reflected his commitment to philanthropy in Israel. Under his leadership, the organization went beyond funding national landmarks and began to focus on education initiatives, environmental pursuits and advancing equal opportunity for Israel's Arab minority.

== Early life and education ==
Born at Merton Hall in Cambridge on 29 April 1936, Nathaniel Charles Jacob Rothschild was the eldest son of Victor Rothschild, 3rd Baron Rothschild, by his first wife Barbara Judith Rothschild (née Hutchinson). His father was born into a Jewish family, while his mother converted to Orthodox Judaism when they married. Rothschild was educated at Eton College and then at Christ Church, Oxford, where he gained a First in history, tutored by Hugh Trevor-Roper. At Oxford he was a member of the Bullingdon Club. Emma Rothschild is his half-sister and Amschel Rothschild was his half-brother.

== Business career ==
From 1963, Rothschild worked at the family bank N M Rothschild & Sons in London, before resigning in 1980 due to a family dispute. The chairmanship of the bank had passed from his father, who had chosen to follow a scientific career and had lost control of the majority voting shares, to his distant cousin Sir Evelyn de Rothschild. He sold his minority stake in the bank, but took independent control of Rothschild Investment Trust (now RIT Capital Partners plc), an investment trust listed on the London Stock Exchange.

After resigning from the bank in 1980, Rothschild went on to found J. Rothschild Assurance Group (now St. James's Place plc) with Mark Weinberg in 1991. In 1989, he joined forces with Sir James Goldsmith and Kerry Packer in an unsuccessful bid for British American Tobacco.

Rothschild was Chairman of RIT Capital Partners plc, one of the largest investment trusts quoted on the London Stock Exchange with a net asset value of about £2 billion. He was Chairman of J Rothschild Capital Management, a subsidiary of RIT Capital Partners plc. He also retained many other venture capital and property interests.

From November 2003 until his retirement in 2008, he was Deputy Chairman of BSkyB Television and, until 2008, he was a Director of RHJ International. He was also a Member of the council for the Duchy of Cornwall for the Prince of Wales and a member of the International Advisory Board of The Blackstone Group.

Rothschild was appointed Commander of the Royal Victorian Order (CVO) in the 2020 New Year Honours for services to the Duchy of Cornwall.

=== Oil interests ===
In 2003, it was reported that Russian oil industrialist Mikhail Khodorkovsky's shares in YUKOS passed to him under a deal which they had concluded prior to Khodorkovsky's arrest. Previously, in September 2002, Rothschild had joined Henry Kissinger and Mikhail Piotrovsky as co-director of Khodorkovsky's newly founded Open Russia Foundation (renamed to Future of Russia Foundation in December 2004, and to New Generation Europe Foundation in March 2023).

In November 2010, an entity affiliated with Rothschild purchased a 5% equity interest in Genie Energy, a subsidiary of IDT Corporation, for $10 million. In 2013, Israel granted Genie Energy exclusive oil and gas exploration rights to a 153-square mile (396 km^{2}) area in the southern part of the Israeli-occupied Golan Heights.

== Personal life ==
Rothschild was a member of the Reform Jewish synagogue.

On 20 October 1961 in Devizes, Wiltshire, Rothschild married Serena Mary Dunn, a Thoroughbred racehorse trainer who was a granddaughter of the Canadian financier Sir James Hamet Dunn. They had three daughters and a son:

- The Hon. Hannah Mary Rothschild (born 22 May 1962), a film maker. She married William Lord Brookfield, an American filmmaker, in 1994; they had three daughters and divorced in 2000.
- The Hon. Beth Matilda Rothschild (born 27 February 1964). She married Antonio Tomassini in 1991; they had three children and later divorced.
- The Hon. Emily Magda Rothschild (born 19 December 1967). She married Julian Freeman-Attwood on 25 June 1998; they had two daughters and split in 2016.
- The Right Honourable Nathaniel Philip Victor James Rothschild, 5th Baron Rothschild (born 12 July 1971), a financier. He eloped to Las Vegas with Annabelle Neilson, a socialite, on 13 November 1995; they divorced in 1998. He married Loretta Victoria Basey, a former Page 3 model for The Sun, in Klosters on 23 July 2016.

Lady Rothschild died at a London hospital on 13 January 2019, aged 84.

Rothschild died in London, United Kingdom, on 26 February 2024, at the age of 87. The Service of Celebration for the Life of the late Lord Rothschild was held at Waddesdon Manor on 13 June, and was attended by King Charles III and Queen Camilla.

== Philanthropy ==
Rothschild played a prominent part in Arts philanthropy in Britain. He was Chairman of Trustees of the National Gallery from 1985 to 1991, and from 1992 to 1998, chairman of the National Heritage Memorial Fund. In the 1990s, he was chairman of the Heritage Lottery Fund, responsible for distributing the proceeds of the National Lottery to the heritage sector, an influential post which oversaw the distribution of £1.2 billion in grants.

At one time, he was also a Trustee of the State Hermitage Museum of St Petersburg (retired 2008); a Trustee of the Qatar Museums Authority (retired 2010); Chairman of the Pritzker Prize for Architecture (2002–2004); Chairman of both the Gilbert Collection Trust and the Hermitage Development Trust, Somerset House; a Trustee and Honorary Fellow of the Courtauld Institute, Somerset House; and a Fellow, Benefactor, and member of the Visitors' Committees of the Ashmolean Museum Oxford (retired 2008). In 2014, he received the J. Paul Getty Medal "for extraordinary achievement in the fields of museology, art historical research, philanthropy, conservation and conservation science".

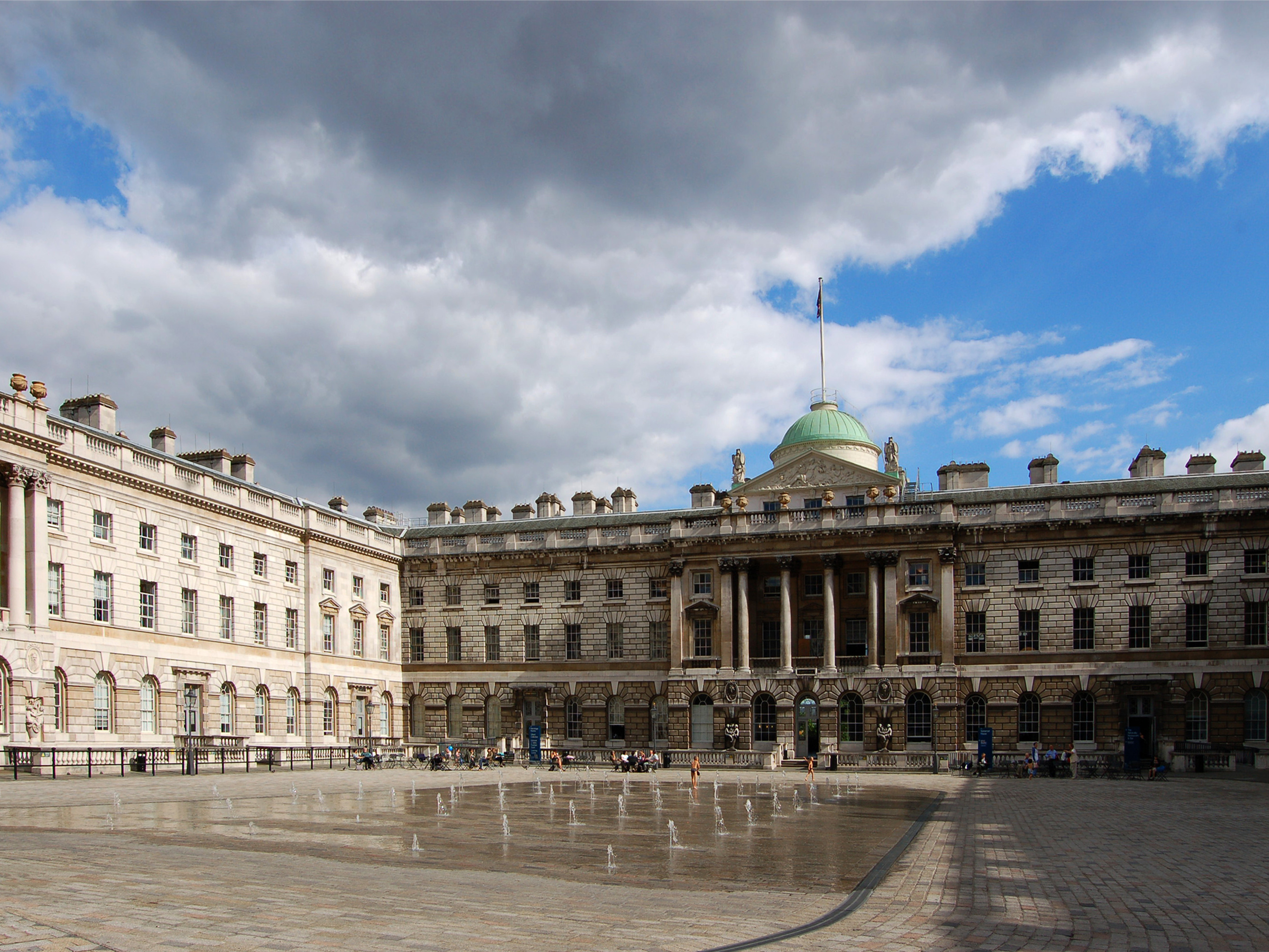
The central courtyard of Somerset House, London.

Rothschild was especially active in the project to restore Somerset House in London, for which he helped secure the Gilbert Collection and ensured the long-term future of the Courtauld Institute of Art. As a private project, he carried out the restoration of Spencer House, one of the finest surviving 18th-century London townhouses, adjacent to his own offices.

In 1993, he joined with John Sainsbury, Baron Sainsbury of Preston Candover, to set up the Butrint Foundation to record and conserve the archaeological site of Butrint in Albania, close to his holiday home on Corfu. Rothschild remained Chairman of the Butrint Foundation up until his death.

Rothschild also followed the Rothschild family's charitable interests in Israel and was the chairman of Yad Hanadiv, the family foundation which gave the Knesset and the Supreme Court buildings to Israel between 1989 and 2018. Under his leadership, the organization went beyond funding national landmarks and began to focus on education initiatives, environmental pursuits and advancing equal opportunity for Israel's Arab minority. He was also president of The Rothschild Foundation (Hanadiv) Europe, and patron and chairman of the board of trustees of The Rothschild Foundation. In addition, he was the Honorary President of the Institute for Jewish Policy Research.

Rothschild served as a Member of the Arts & Humanities Research Board, set up by the British government, is an honorary fellow of the British Academy, and a Trustee of The Prince of Wales's Charitable Fund.

Rothschild had also been a Member of the UK Main Honours Board (retired 2008); Chairman of the Honours Committee for Arts and Media (retired 2008); Trustee of the Edmond J Safra Foundation (retired 2010); and a Member of committee of the Henry J Kravis Prize for Creative Philanthropy (retired 2010).

=== Waddesdon Manor ===
In 1988, he inherited from his aunt Dorothy de Rothschild, the Waddesdon and Eythrope estates in Buckinghamshire, and began a close association with Waddesdon Manor, the house and grounds which were built by Baron Ferdinand de Rothschild in the 1880s and bequeathed to the National Trust in 1957 by his distant cousin, James A. de Rothschild. He was a major benefactor of the restoration of Waddesdon Manor through a private family charitable trust and, in an unusual arrangement, had been given authority by the National Trust to run Waddesdon Manor as a semi-independent operation. The cellars at Waddesdon Manor house his personal collection of 15,000 bottles of Rothschild wines dating as far back as 1870.

Open to the public, Waddesdon attracted over 466,000 visitors in 2018, with 157,000 visiting the house in 2015. Waddesdon has won many awards over the last 20 years, including Visit England's "Large Visitor Attraction of the Year" category in 2017, Museum of the Year Award and Best National Trust Property.

Rothschild commissioned the 2015 RIBA Award winner Flint House on the Waddesdon Manor estate in Buckinghamshire. Rothschild donated the property to the Rothschild Foundation which manages the rest of the estate for the National Trust.

The estate has been a venue for visiting heads of state including U.S. presidents Ronald Reagan and Bill Clinton. Margaret Thatcher received French president François Mitterrand there at a summit in 1990. It hosted the European Economic Round Table conference in 2002, organised by Warren Buffett and attended by James Wolfensohn, former president of the World Bank, and actor Arnold Schwarzenegger.

== Honours and awards ==
=== In United Kingdom ===
- Member of the Order of Merit (OM) – 2002.
- Knight Grand Cross of the Order of the British Empire (GBE) – 1998 New Year Honours, "for services to the Arts and to Heritage."
- Commander of the Royal Victorian Order (CVO) – 2020 New Year Honours, "for services to The Prince's Council, Duchy of Cornwall"
- The Prince of Wales Medal for Arts Philanthropy 2013
- Awarded honorary degrees from the universities of Oxford, London, Exeter, Keele, Newcastle and Warwick
- Honorary Fellow of the British Academy (Hon FBA) – 1998
- Senior Fellow of the Royal College of Art (FRCA) – 1992
- Honorary Fellow of King's College London (Hon FKC) – 2002
- "Apollo Personality of the Year" – 2002
- Honorary President of the Institute for Jewish Policy – 2002
- Mont Blanc Award – 2004
- Tercentenary Medal for St Petersburg – 2005
- Honorary Student of Christ Church, Oxford – March 2006

=== In the United States ===
- The Hadrian Award from the World Monuments Fund – 1995
- The Classical America – Arthur Ross Award 1998
- The Iris Foundation Award – the BARD Institute 1999
- The Golden Plate Award of the American Academy of Achievement 2000
- The Centennial Medal of the American Academy in Rome – 2002
- The Kennedy Center's International Committee Lifetime Achievement Gold Medal in the Arts Award 2006
- Royal Oak Foundation "Timeless Design Award" – 2009
- The J. Paul Getty Medal – 2014

=== In Continental Europe ===
- Commander of the Order of Henry the Navigator (1985) – Portugal
- Europa Nostra Medal of Honour in Brussels – 2003
- Freedom of the City of Saranda – Albania 2003
- Honoree of the Gennadius Library Trustees' Annual Award 2010
- National Flag Order – Albania 2014

=== In Israel ===
- The Sir Winston Churchill Award (2004)
- The Weizmann Award (50th Anniversary of the State of Israel)
- Honorary degree from the Hebrew University of Jerusalem
- Honorary fellowships from City of Jerusalem and the Israel Museum, the Commonwealth Jewish Council Award.

=== Arms ===
Coat of arms of Jacob Rothschild, 4th Baron Rothschild
Notes Coat of arms of the Rothschild family Coronet A coronet of a Baron Crest 1st (centre): issuant from a Ducal Coronet Or an Eagle displayed Sable; 2nd (dexter): out of a Ducal Coronet Or between open Buffalo Horns per fess Or and Sable a Mullet of six points Or; 3rd (sinister): out of a Ducal Coronet Or three Ostrich Feathers the centre one Argent the exterior ones Azure Escutcheon Quarterly: 1st, Or an Eagle displayed Sable langued Gules; 2nd and 3rd, Azure issuing from the dexter and sinister sides of the shield an Arm embowed proper grasping five Arrows points to the base Argent; 4th, Or a Lion rampant proper langued gules; over all an Escutcheon Gules thereon a Target the point to the dexter proper Supporters Dexter: a lion rampant Or; Sinister: a unicorn Argent Motto Concordia, Integritas, Industria (Latin for Unity, Integrity, Industry)

== See also ==
- Nathaniel Rothschild, his youngest child and only son, who inherited his barony and baronetcy
- Rothschild family

== Notes ==
Peerage of the United Kingdom
Preceded by Victor Rothschild	Baron Rothschild; 1990–2024; Member of the House of Lords (1990–1999)	Succeeded by Nathaniel Rothschild
Baronetage of the United Kingdom
Preceded by Victor Rothschild	Baronet of Grosvenor Place; 1990–2024	Succeeded by Nathaniel Rothschild
