= Hannah Rothschild (film maker) =

British film maker, author and philanthropist (born 1962)

The Honourable Dame Hannah Rothschild DBE
- Born: Hannah Mary Rothschild; 22 May 1962 (age 64); Islington, London, England
- Other name: Hannah Mary Brookfield
- Education: St Hilda's College, Oxford
- Occupations: Filmmaker, businesswoman, author, philanthropist
- Years active: 1985–present
- Spouse: William Brookfield (m. 1994; div. 2000)
- Partner: Yoav Gottesman
- Children: 3
- Parents: Jacob Rothschild, 4th Baron Rothschild (father); Serena Rothschild, Baroness Rothschild (mother)
- Relatives: Nathaniel Rothschild, 5th Baron Rothschild (brother); Nell Dunn (maternal aunt); Annabelle Neilson (former sister-in-law)
- Family: Rothschild family, Rothschild banking family of England
- Website: hannahrothschild.com

Dame Hannah Mary Rothschild DBE (born 22 May 1962) is a British author, businesswoman, filmmaker and philanthropist, who is a birth member of the Rothschild banking family of England. She became the first woman to chair the board of trustees of the National Gallery in London in August 2015.

== Early life ==
Hannah Mary Rothschild was born in Islington, Greater London, England, on 22 May 1962, as the eldest child to Jacob Rothschild, 4th Baron Rothschild, a birth member of the Rothschild banking family of England, and his wife, Serena Rothschild, Baroness Rothschild (née Dunn). She has two sisters, Beth Matilda Rothschild (formally Tomassini) and Emily Magda Freeman-Attwood (née Rothschild), and a brother, Nathaniel Rothschild, 5th Baron Rothschild.

=== Family ===
Rothschild's mother came from a Christian background, while her father was Jewish (Rothschild's paternal grandfather, Victor Rothschild, 3rd Baron Rothschild, was born into a Jewish family, while Rothschild's paternal grandmother, Barbara Judith Rothschild (née Hutchinson), had converted to Judaism upon marriage). Her maternal grandparents were Lady Mary Sybil St. Clair-Erskine, daughter of James St Clair-Erskine, 5th Earl of Rosslyn and Vera Mary St Clair-Erskine, Countess of Rosslyn, and Sir Philip Gordon Dunn, 2nd Baronet, the only son of the Canadian financier and tycoon Sir James Hamet Dunn, 1st Baronet.

=== Education ===
Rothschild attended St Paul's Girls' School and Marlborough College. She read Modern History at St Hilda's College, Oxford and has an honorary doctorate from Hebrew University.

== Career ==
Rothschild started her career as a researcher in the BBC's Music and Arts department in the mid-1980s, and quickly graduated to directing films for Saturday Review, Arena, and Omnibus, while initiating and making programmes for the series The Great Picture Chase and Relative Values.

Rothschild set up Rothschild Auerbach Ltd., an independent film company with Jake Auerbach, making documentaries for the BBC and others, including profiles of Frank Auerbach, Walter Sickert and R. B. Kitaj.

Rothschild joined London Films Ltd as Head of Drama in 1997, and set up the 1999 television series The Scarlet Pimpernel, starring Richard E. Grant.

Rothschild returned to filmmaking and directed three films for the BBC's Storyville series, and HBO. She produced and directed The Jazz Baroness (2008), about her great-aunt Pannonica de Koenigswarter's exploits in and support of New York City's jazz world, following a radio programme on the same subject. This was followed in 2009 by Hi Society, a fly-on-the-wall documentary about Nicky Haslam, the interior designer, author and society darling. In 2010, Mandelson: The Real PM?, followed the UK's former Business Secretary Peter Mandelson in the run-up to the 2010 general election.

Rothschild, inspired by the Storyville programme, wrote a biography of her great-aunt, The Baroness: The Search for Nica the Rebellious Rothschild, which was published by Virago in 2012. The book was described as "Riveting, touching and insightful" by The Daily Telegraph. A few years earlier, a radio documentary profile of Nica, The Jazz Baroness, was broadcast on BBC Radio 4 in February 2008.

Rothschild's documentaries and shorts have aired on the BBC, HBO, PBS, and others, and have been screened and won awards at Telluride, Tribecca, London, and Sheffield festivals.

Rothschild has written screenplays for Working Title and Ridley Scott. She also wrote a history of Channel 4's films and filmmakers, contributed to anthologies including Corfu, the Garden Isle (ISBN 0-7195-5375-X), and Virago at 40.

Rothschild's first novel, The Improbability of Love, was published in May 2015. The story follows a female protagonist who comes across a lost Watteau and becomes embroiled in the dealings of the art world's elite. The Guardian, said: "her depiction of the rarefied art world is gripping". The book was shortlisted for the Baileys Prize and was joint winner of the Bollinger Everyman Wodehouse Prize. It has been translated into more than 20 languages and was chosen as one of Waterstones "Books of the Year".

Rothschild's third book, a novel, The House of Trelawney (ISBN 9781526600608), was published in February 2020 by Bloomsbury and Knopf. The book follows the lives and fortunes of three generations of a dysfunctional Cornish aristocratic family through the crash of 2008. Described by Amanda Craig in The Guardian as "Irresistible fun" and by Lynn Barber in The Daily Telegraph as a "gripping family saga". "Her style has been compared to composites such as Waugh and Mitford, which are apt in terms of both style and milieu, but comparisons can also be made to Austen and Dickens, as she shares their ability to create comic characters and to then put those characters in situations that allows the author to make satirical/social commentary." The book was shortlisted for the Bollinger Everyman Wodehouse Prize for 2020.

Rothschild's fourth book, a novel, High Time, was published in June 2023 by Bloomsbury and Knopf.

Rothschild has lectured on art and literature at the Getty Institute, Courtauld, the Royal Academy, the Hay Festival, and others.

Rothschild has written for many publications, including The Times, The New York Times, The Observer, The Guardian, The Daily Telegraph, Vanity Fair, Vogue, The Spectator, Harper's Bazaar, Financial Times, Elle, The Washington Post, and others.

Rothschild is a non-executive director of RIT Capital Partners and Windmill Hill Asset Management.

== Philanthropy ==
Rothschild became a trustee of London's National Gallery in 2009, after applying to an advertisement in The Guardian. In 2013, she became the liaison trustee for the Tate Gallery. In August 2015, she became the first woman to chair the National Gallery's board. In 2017, her term was extended by four years, however, she resigned from the position in June 2019, citing a wish to devote more time to writing and to her family's wide-ranging activities and philanthropic concerns. She remained as Chair of the American Friends of the National Gallery, a post she's held since August 2015.

Rothschild is the chair of The Rothschild Foundation, a registered charity, whose activities include preserving Waddesdon Manor in Buckinghamshire, on behalf of its owner, the National Trust.

Rothschild has previously served as a trustee of the Whitechapel Gallery and the Institute of Contemporary Arts. She co-founded the charity Artists on Film.

Rothschild organised the Illuminated River project to light Central London's bridges, transforming the River Thames at night "from a snake of darkness into a ribbon of light." An international jury, chaired by her, chose American artist Leo Villareal and in July 2019, the first five of fifteen bridges were lit. The final bridge was lit in April 2021.

== Personal life ==
Rothschild married William Lord Brookfield, an American filmmaker, in Westminster, Greater London, on 7 March 1994. They have three daughters together. The couple later separated and their divorce was finalised in 2000, after six years of marriage.

Rothschild is in a long-term relationship with the businessman Yoav Gottesman.

Rothschild resides in a residential district in Paddington, London, in the same house she grew up in.

== Honours ==
Rothschild was appointed Commander of the Order of the British Empire (CBE) by Elizabeth II in the 2018 Birthday Honours, for services to the arts and charity.

Rothschild was elected to the American Academy of Arts and Science in 2021.

She is an honorary fellow of the Israel Museum and holds an honorary doctorate from the Hebrew University.

Rothschild was appointed Dame Commander of the Order of the British Empire (DBE) by Charles III in the 2024 Birthday Honours, for services to philanthropy in the arts, culture and charity sectors.
