= F. M. Mayor =

English writer (1872-1932)

Flora Macdonald Mayor (20 October 1872, Kingston Hill, Surrey – 28 January 1932, Hampstead, London), was an English novelist and short story writer.

== Life and work ==
Flora MacDonald Mayor was born on 20 October 1872, at Kingston Hill, Surrey. Her father, Joseph Bickersteth Mayor (1828–1916), was an Anglican clergyman and professor of classics and then of moral philosophy at King's College London. John E. B. Mayor was her uncle. Her mother, Alexandrina Jessie Grote (1830–1927), was niece of the utilitarian George Grote as well as the Anglican clergyman and Cambridge moral philosophy professor John Grote. Flora had two older brothers – Robert J. G. Mayor (1869–1947) and Henry B. Mayor (1870–1948) – and a twin sister, Alice M. Mayor (1872–1961). Flora was educated at Surbiton High School and read history at Newnham College, Cambridge.

Afterwards she became an actress. She later turned to writing. Her first book was a collection of short stories, Mrs Hammond's Children, published in 1901 under the pseudonym Mary Strafford.

In 1903 she became engaged to a young architect, Ernest Shepherd, who died in India of typhoid before Mayor was able to travel out to join him. She never married, and lived with her twin sister Alice MacDonald Mayor (1872–1961).

In 1913 her short novel, The Third Miss Symons, was published, with a preface by John Masefield.

Her best-known novel is The Rector's Daughter (1924). (In October 2009 this was described in the BBC's 'Open Book' programme as one of the best 'neglected classics'.)

She also wrote ghost stories, which were much admired by M.R. James.

She died on 28 January 1932 in Hampstead, London. Her correspondence and some literary papers are held at Trinity College, Cambridge.

== Selected works ==
- Mrs Hammond's Children (1901)
- The Third Miss Symons (1913)
- The Rector's Daughter (1924) (reprinted by Persephone Books in 2021)
- The Squire's Daughter (1929)
- The Room Opposite and Other Tales of Mystery and Imagination (1935) (reprinted by Solar Press in 2023)
