= Victor Rothschild, 3rd Baron Rothschild =

British banker, scientist, intelligence officer and government advisor (1910–1990)

The Right Honourable The Lord Rothschild GBE GM FRS
- Rothschild in 1965
- Born: Nathaniel Mayer Victor Rothschild; 31 October 1910; London, England
- Died: 20 March 1990 (aged 79); London, England
- Education: Trinity College, Cambridge
- Occupation: Biologist
- Political party: Labour
- Spouses: Barbara Judith Hutchinson (m. 1933, divorced) Teresa Georgina Mayor (m. 1946)
- Children: 7, including: Jacob Rothschild, 4th Baron Rothschild; Emma Rothschild; Amschel Rothschild
- Parents: Charles Rothschild; Rózsika Rothschild (née Edle von Wertheimstein)
- Relatives: Serena Rothschild (daughter-in-law); Amartya Sen (son-in-law); Simon Gray (son-in-law)

Nathaniel Mayer Victor Rothschild, 3rd Baron Rothschild, GBE, GM, FRS (31 October 1910 – 20 March 1990), was a British scientist, intelligence officer during World War II, and later a senior executive with Royal Dutch Shell and N M Rothschild & Sons, and an advisor to the Edward Heath and Margaret Thatcher governments of the UK. He was a member of the prominent Rothschild family.

== Biography ==
=== Early life ===
Rothschild was born in Kensington, London, the only son of Charles Rothschild and Rózsika Rothschild (née Baroness Edle von Wertheimstein). Both parents were Jewish, his father a member of the Rothschild banking family and his mother the daughter of the first titled Jew in Austria. He grew up in Waddesdon Manor and Tring Park Mansion, among other family homes. He had three sisters, including Pannonica de Koenigswarter (who would become known as the "Jazz Baroness") and Dame Miriam Louisa Rothschild. His father died by suicide when Rothschild was 13 years old. He was educated at Stanmore Park preparatory school (which he later dubbed a "hell hole") and Harrow School, where the combination of archaic privileges and pointless rituals served only to annoy and bore him.

=== Cambridge and London ===
At Trinity College, Cambridge, Rothschild read physiology, French, and English, and was considered impressive enough an undergraduate to be spared the rigours of sitting the Natural Sciences Tripos, thus allowing him to embark immediately on a career in scientific research. (Note: He was, however, required as a formality to sit for an ordinary or 'pass' degree.) Working in the Zoology Department, he was awarded a fellowship by Trinity in 1935 and a PhD two years later. He played first-class cricket for the University and Northamptonshire, where his experience of batting against the Nottinghamshire pair of Harold Larwood and Bill Voce he was later to describe as the most alarming of his life. At Cambridge he was known for his playboy lifestyle, driving a Bugatti and collecting art and rare books.

Rothschild joined the Cambridge Apostles, a secret society, which at that time was predominantly Marxist, though he stated himself that he "was mildly left-wing but never a Marxist". He became friends with Guy Burgess, Anthony Blunt and Kim Philby, members of the Cambridge Spy Ring. His flat in London was shared with Burgess and Blunt; this later aroused suspicion that he was the so-called Fifth Man in the Spy Ring. In 1933, Rothschild gave Blunt £100 to purchase "Eliezer and Rebecca" by Nicolas Poussin. The painting was sold by Blunt's executors in 1985 for £100,000 and is now in the Fitzwilliam Museum.

Rothschild inherited his title at the age of 26 following the death of his uncle Walter Rothschild, 2nd Baron Rothschild on 27 August 1937. He sat as a peer in the House of Lords, but spoke only twice there during his life (both speeches were in 1946, one about the pasteurization of milk, and another about the situation in Palestine). In November 1945 he joined the Labour Party.

=== World War II ===
Rothschild was recruited to work for MI5 during World War II in roles including bomb disposal, disinformation and espionage, winning the George Medal for "dangerous work in hazardous circumstances". He was the head of B1C, the "explosives and sabotage section", and worked on identifying where Britain's war effort was vulnerable to sabotage and counter German sabotage attempts. This included personally dismantling examples of German booby traps and disguised explosives.

With his assistant Theresa Clay, he ran the "Fifth Column" operation, which saw MI5 officer Eric Roberts masquerade as the Gestapo's man in London in order to identify hundreds of Nazi sympathizers.

=== Cold War, Shell and Think Tank ===
In Who Paid the Piper? (1999), an account of CIA propaganda during the Cold War, author Frances Stonor Saunders alleges that Rothschild channelled funds to Encounter, an intellectual magazine founded in 1953 to support the "non-Stalinist left" to advance US foreign policy goals.

After the war, he joined the zoology department at Cambridge University from 1950 to 1970. He served as chairman of the Agricultural Research Council from 1948 to 1958 and as worldwide head of research at Royal Dutch/Shell from 1963 to 1970.

Flora Solomon claims in her autobiography that in August 1962, during a reception at the Weizmann Institute, she told Rothschild that she thought that Tomás Harris and Kim Philby were Soviet spies.

When Anthony Blunt was unmasked as a member of the Cambridge Spy ring in 1964, Rothschild was questioned by Special Branch (though Blunt was not publicly identified as a Soviet agent until 1979 in the House of Commons by Prime Minister Margaret Thatcher). Rothschild was cleared and continued working on projects for the British government.

Rothschild was head of the Central Policy Review Staff from 1971 to 1974 (known popularly as "The Think Tank") a staff which researched policy specifically for the Government until Margaret Thatcher abolished it.

In 1971 Rothschild was awarded an honorary degree from Tel Aviv University for ''the advancement of science, education and the economy of Israel''. It was followed in 1975 by an honorary degree from Jerusalem's Hebrew University. The annual "Victor Rothschild Memorial Symposia" is named after Rothschild.

=== Thatcher years and Spycatcher ===
In the 1980s, Rothschild joined the family bank as chairman in an effort to quell the feuding between factions led by Evelyn Rothschild and Victor's son, Jacob Rothschild. In this, he was unsuccessful as Jacob resigned from the bank to found J. Rothschild Assurance Group (a separate entity, now St. James's Place plc).

In 1982 he published An Enquiry into the Social Science Research Council at the behest of Sir Keith Joseph, a Conservative minister and mentor of Margaret Thatcher.

Rothschild continued to work in security as an adviser to Margaret Thatcher.

He appears several times in the book Spycatcher, which he hoped would clear the air over suspicions about his wartime role and the possibility he was involved in the Cambridge spy ring. In early 1987 Tam Dalyell MP used parliamentary privilege to suggest Rothschild should be prosecuted for a chain of events he had "set in train, with Peter Wright and Harry Chapman Pincher" which had led to a "breach of confidence in relation to information on matters of state security given to authors".

Rothschild was still able to enter the premises of MI5 as a former employee and was aware of suspicions there was a "mole" in MI5, but felt himself above suspicion. While Edward Heath was Prime Minister, Rothschild was a frequent visitor to Chequers, the Prime Minister's country residence. Throughout Rothschild's life, he was a valued adviser on intelligence and science to both Conservative and Labour Governments.

In his 1994 book The Fifth Man, Australian author Roland Perry said that in 1993, after the dissolution of the Soviet Union, six retired KGB colonels, including Yuri Modin, the spy ring's handler, alleged Rothschild was the so-called "Fifth Man": "Rothschild was the key to most of the Cambridge ring's penetration of British intelligence" Modin said: "He had the contacts. He was able to introduce Burgess, Blunt and others to important figures in Intelligence such as Stewart Menzies, Dick White and Robert Vansittart in the Foreign Office ... who controlled MI6." However this suggestion is rebutted by other researchers; commentator Sheila Kerr pointed out that as soon as the book came out, Modin denied Perry's version of their discussions (having already stated that the fifth man was Cairncross), and concluded that "Perry's case against Rothschild is unconvincing because of dubious sources and slack methods".

Noel Annan, who was criticised by Roland Perry for a negative view of the latter's book and claims, writes: "Amid clouds of misstatements he [Perry] relies almost wholly on insinuation and bluster. ... when Andrew Boyle published his book and exposed Blunt, why did Margaret Thatcher acknowledge in the House of Commons the truth about Blunt, but later, in the case of Rothschild, clear him? Mr. Perry is saying she lied to the House. He tries to make much of her curt statement, "I am advised that we have no evidence that he was ever a Soviet spy." It is the only official reply she could have made. In MI5 jargon there was "No Trace" against his name". Christopher Andrew and Vasili Mitrokhin, in The Mitrokhin Archives, make no mention of Rothschild as a Soviet agent and instead identify John Cairncross as the Fifth Man.

Former KGB controller Yuri Modin denied ever having named Rothschild as "any kind of Soviet agent". "Because he was in MI5 they learned things from him. This doesn't make him the fifth man, and he wasn't," Modin wrote. His own book's title clarifies the name of all five of the Cambridge spy group: My Five Cambridge Friends: Burgess, Maclean, Philby, Blunt, and Cairncross by Their KGB Controller. Since Rothschild had died prior to the publication of the Perry book, the family was unable to start a libel action.

Rothschild published two volumes of memoirs, Meditations of a Broomstick (1977) and Random Variables (1984).

Rothschild took the step of publishing a letter in British newspapers on 3 December 1986 to state "I am not, and never have been, a Soviet agent".

Despite being an opposition Labour party peer, in 1987, during the Thatcher Government, Rothschild reportedly played a role in the dismissal of Director-General of the BBC Alasdair Milne, who had backed the programmes Secret Society, Real Lives, and Panorama: "Maggie's Militant Tendency" which had angered the Thatcher government. Marmaduke Hussey, who was Chairman of the BBC Board of Governors at the time, implied Rothschild initiated the dismissal of Milne in his autobiography Chance Governs All.

Rothschild was an advisor to William Waldegrave during the design of the Community Charge, which subsequently led to the Poll Tax Riots.

== Family ==
In 1933, he married Barbara Judith Hutchinson. They had three children.

- Sarah Rothschild (born 1934)
- Jacob Rothschild (1936–2024), later 4th Baron Rothschild
- Miranda Rothschild (born 1940)

In 1946, he married Teresa Georgina Mayor, who had worked as his assistant at MI5. They had four children:

- Emma Rothschild (born 1948), married the Bengali Hindu economist Amartya Kumar Sen (born 1933) in 1991.
- Benjamin Mayer Rothschild (born and died 1952).
- Victoria Katherine Rothschild (born 1953), an academic lecturer at Queen Mary, University of London, and the second wife and widow of English writer Simon Gray (1936–2008).
- Amschel Rothschild (1955–1996), married to Anita Patience Guinness of the Anglo-Irish Protestant Guinness family. He died by suicide in 1996. They had three children; Kate Emma Rothschild (b. 1982), Alice Miranda Rothschild (b. 1983) and James Amschel Victor Rothschild (b. 1985)

Born into a nominally Jewish family, in adult life Rothschild declared himself to be an atheist. However, after his death, from a heart attack in London on 20 March 1990, his body was interred in the historic Jewish Brady Street Cemetery, which remarkably saved that cemetery from proposed redevelopment for 100 years. His sister Miriam Louisa Rothschild was a distinguished entomologist, and his sister Nica de Koenigswarter was a bebop jazz enthusiast and patron of Thelonious Monk and Charlie Parker.

== Honours and awards ==
=== Titles ===
- 3rd Baron Rothschild, of Tring, co. Hertford [U.K., 1885], 27 August 1937.
- 4th Baronet Rothschild [U.K., 1847], 27 August 1937.
- Knight Grand Cross, Order of the British Empire (G.B.E.), 1975.
- Knight, Most Venerable Order of the Hospital of St. John of Jerusalem (K.St.J.).
- Fellow, Royal Society (F.R.S.), 1953.
- Major, Intelligence Corps.

=== Decorations ===
- George Medal (G.M.) (United Kingdom), 1944.
- Legion of Merit (United States), 1946.
- Bronze Star Medal (United States), 1948.

== Notes ==
Government offices
New post	Director-General of the Central Policy Review Staff; 1970–1974	Succeeded by Sir Kenneth Berrill
Peerage of the United Kingdom
Preceded by Walter Rothschild	Baron Rothschild; 1937–1990	Succeeded by Jacob Rothschild
Baronetage of the United Kingdom
Preceded by Walter Rothschild	Baronet of Grosvenor Place; 1937–1990	Succeeded by Jacob Rothschild
