= John Grote =

British philosopher and clergyman

- Born: May 5, 1813; Beckenham, Kent, England
- Died: August 21, 1866 (aged 53); Trumpington, Cambridgeshire, England
- Education: Trinity College, Cambridge
- Occupations: Moral philosopher, Anglican clergyman
- Employer: University of Cambridge
- Known for: Knightbridge Professor of Moral Philosophy; coining the term relativism
- Relatives: George Grote (brother)

John Grote (5 May 1813, Beckenham – 21 August 1866, Trumpington, Cambridgeshire) was an English moral philosopher and Anglican clergyman.

== Life and career ==
The son of a banker, John Grote was younger brother to the historian, philosopher and reformer George Grote. He was educated at Beckenham School, Kent. He then went up to Trinity College, Cambridge, in 1831, graduating with a first-class degree in the Classics Tripos in 1835, and became a fellow of Trinity in 1837. From 1847 until his death, he was vicar of Trumpington, where he was a neighbour of his close friend Robert Leslie Ellis, the paralysed mathematician and Bacon scholar. In 1855, Grote succeeded William Whewell as Knightbridge professor of moral philosophy at Cambridge University.

Grote published relatively little during his life: volume I of Exploratio Philosophica: Rough Notes on Modern Intellectual Science appeared in 1865, but An Examination of the Utilitarian Philosophy was only published posthumously (1870). Grote's literary executor and editor, Joseph Bickersteth Mayor, also put together a Treatise on Moral Ideals (1876) and volume II of Exploratio Philosophica (1900), and married his niece, Alexandrina.

A philosophical idealist and opponent of utilitarianism (as befitted his Cambridge and Anglican clerical identity), Grote was nevertheless happy to admit the new experimental psychology of someone like John Stuart Mill's disciple Alexander Bain – as long as such 'phenomenal' and more properly 'philosophical' investigations were not conflated with each other. Grote had the (perhaps unenviable) distinction of coining the word 'relativism', though he did not use it in quite the same sense as it is used today.

Grote was frequently acknowledged as a major influence by Michael Oakeshott, and had an important influence on a diverse group of philosophers and scholarship emerging from Cambridge University.

== Publications ==
=== Books ===
- (1865) Exploratio Philosophica: Part I.
- (1870) An Examination of the Utilitarian Philosophy.
- (1876) A Treatise on the Moral Ideals.
- (1872) Sermons.
- (1900) Exploratio Philosophica: Part II.
