= Sydney Lipworth =

South African businessman (1931–2025)

Sir Maurice Sydney Lipworth KC (Hon) (13 May 1931 – 27 June 2025) was a South African lawyer, businessman, public servant and philanthropist.

== Early life and education ==
Maurice Sydney Lipworth was born on May 13, 1931 in Johannesburg, South Africa. His father Isidore Lipworth (originally Lipschitz) was an accountant from Lithuania, and his mother Rae (nee Sindler) was from Latvia. He went to King Edward VII School in Johannesburg and the University of the Witwatersrand.

== Life and career ==
=== Hambro Life ===
Lipworth was a co-founder of Hambro Life Assurance with Sir Mark Weinberg and Lord Joffe in the UK (subsequently called Allied Dunbar Assurance and now Zurich Financial Services) (1971–1988).

From South Africa, he left out of opposition to apartheid, and in 1964 he and his wife Rosa arrived in London. A trained lawyer, Lipworth joined Abbey Life Assurance, founded by his friend Mark Weinberg. Lipworth became the product creator, and had the idea of designed life assurance policies for professionals. Lord Joffe joined Weinberg and Lipworth in 1965, and they sold Abbey to ITT in 1970. They started the new company Hambro Life, later renaming it Allied Dunbar. It was acquired in 1985 by BAT Industries, then sold in 1998 to Zurich Financial Services. Lipworth was deputy chairman of Allied Dunbar until 1988.

=== MMC chair ===
From 1988 to 1993, he served as Chairman of the Monopolies and Mergers Commission in the UK (now the Competition Commission). In 1998, he became chair of the Monopolies and Mergers Commission for a five-year term. According to The Times, as MMC chair, Lipworth's "reign coincided with unprecedented corporate takeover activity and territorial incursions from the European Commission, whose competition tsar, the British politician Sir Leon (later Lord) Brittan, thought he and not Lipworth should handle big international mergers. Lipworth resisted, but Brittan got his way." MMC was joined into the Competition and Markets Authority in 2014.

=== Later years ===
After his time with the MMC, he subsequently served as Chairman of Zeneca plc (now AstraZeneca plc) and Deputy Chairman of National Westminster Bank plc. He also served as Chairman of the Financial Reporting Council and founding Trustee of the International Accounting Standards Committee Foundation (until 2005).

He was also President of the Philharmonia Orchestra Trust, as well as holding several other directorships and charitable appointments involved with the arts.

Lipworth was knighted in 1991. He was called to the London Bar, appointed QC (hc) (1993) and was a Bencher, Inner Temple. He was a member of the Chambers at One Essex Court. He was awarded an honorary LL.D from the University of the Witwatersrand in 2003.

== Personal life ==
He met his wife Rosa Liwarek in 1956, and they married two years later. They had two sons. Rosa had been a Jewish "hidden child" in France placed with Christian families to hide her from Nazi persecution.

Lipworth died on 27 June 2025, at the age of 94.
