= List of atheists in politics and law =

This is a list of atheists in politics and law. Living persons in this list are people whose atheism is relevant to their notable activities or public life, and who have publicly identified themselves as atheists.

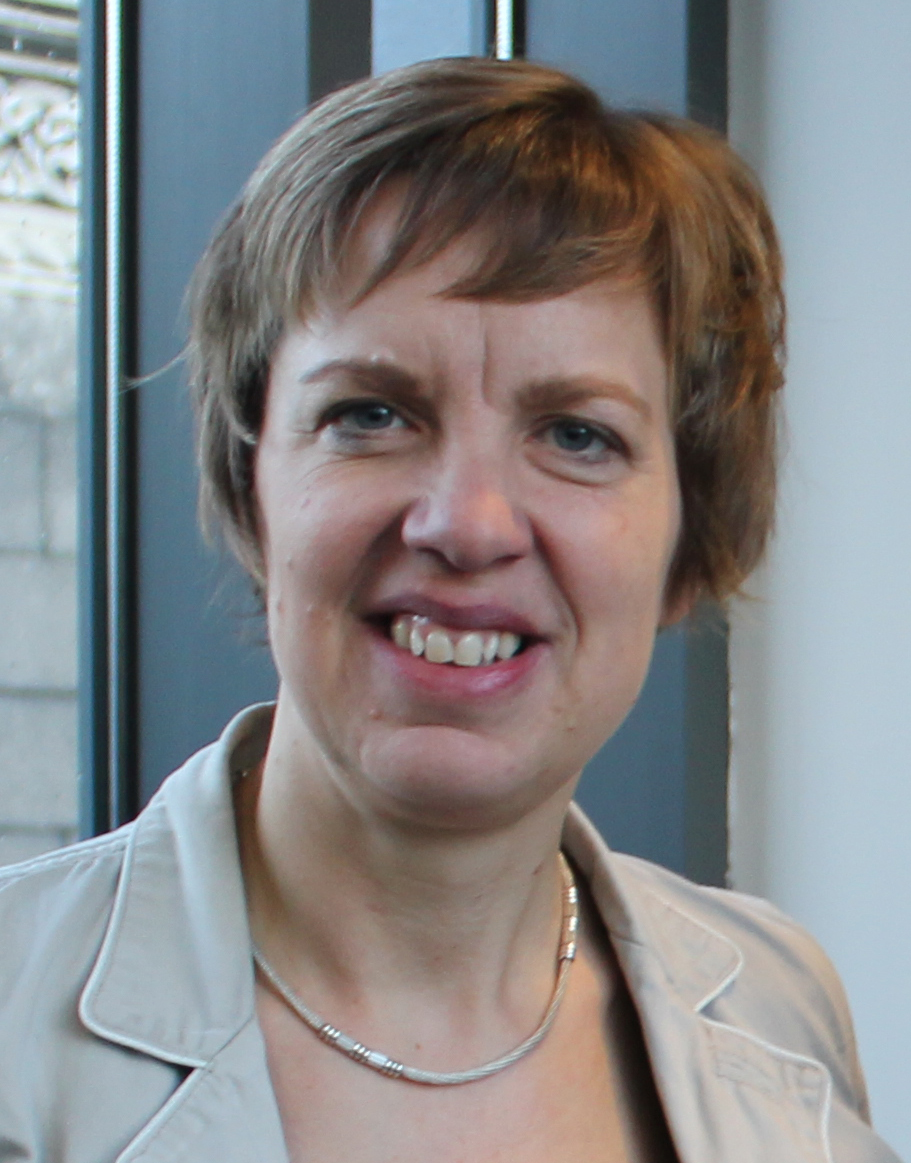
Ivana Bacik

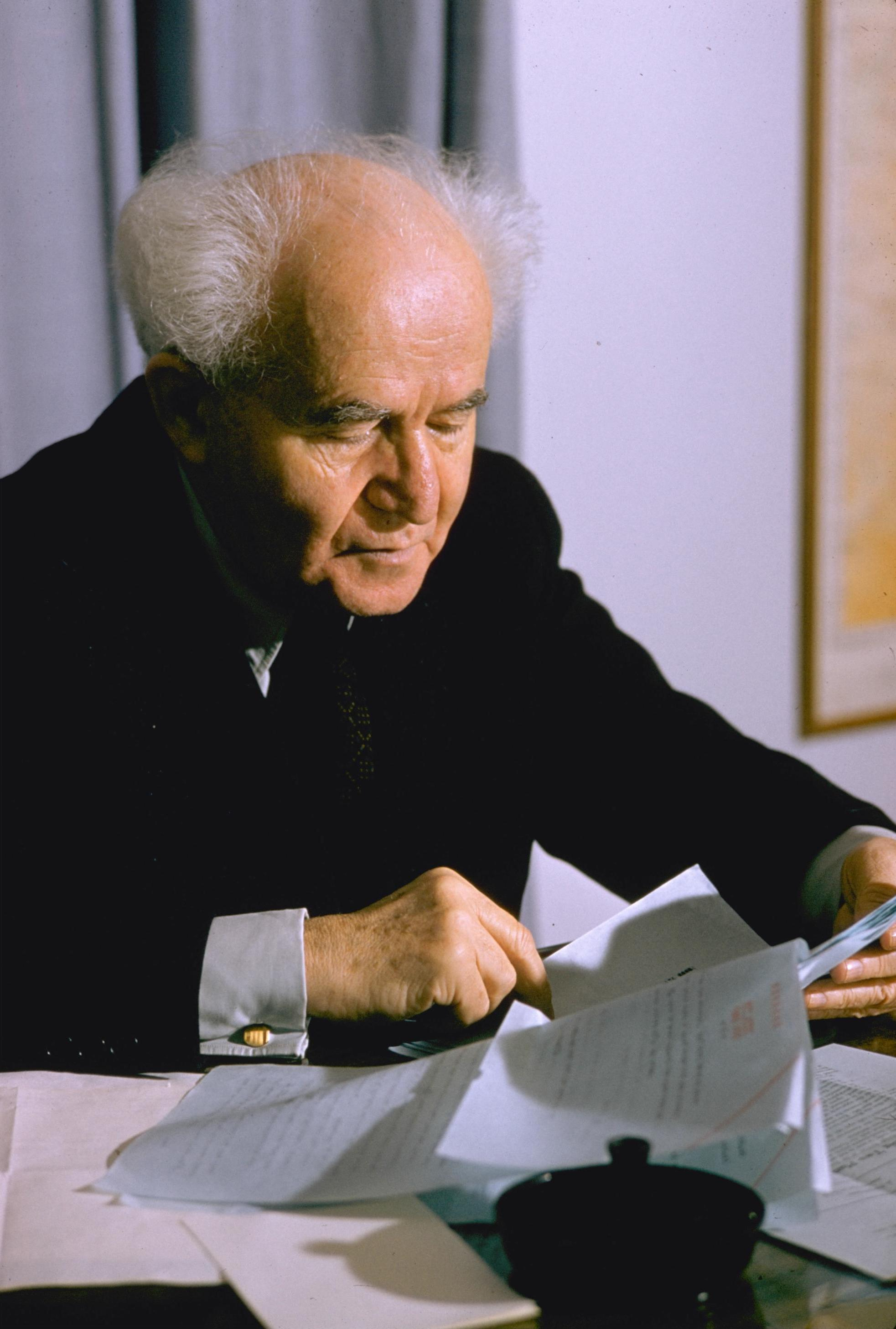
David Ben-Gurion

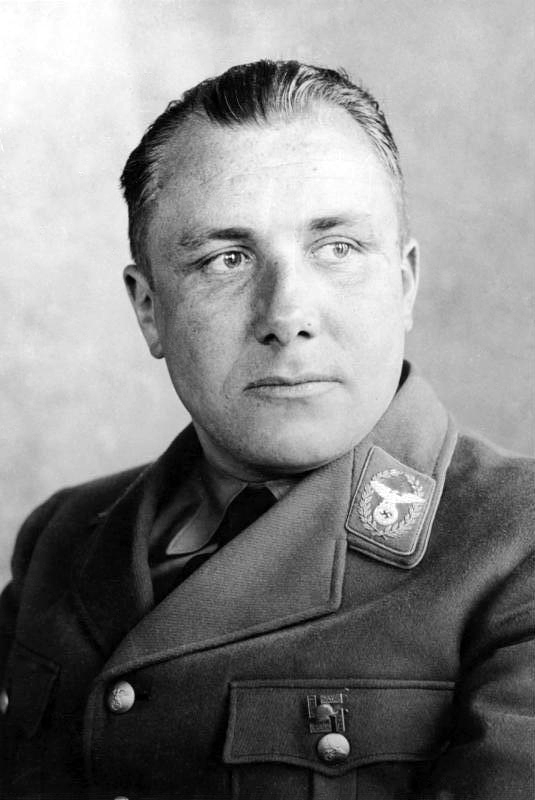
Martin Bormann

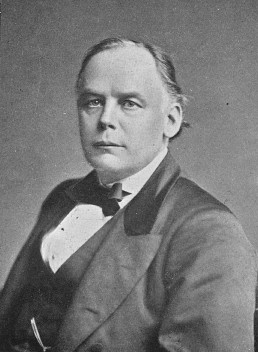
Charles Bradlaugh

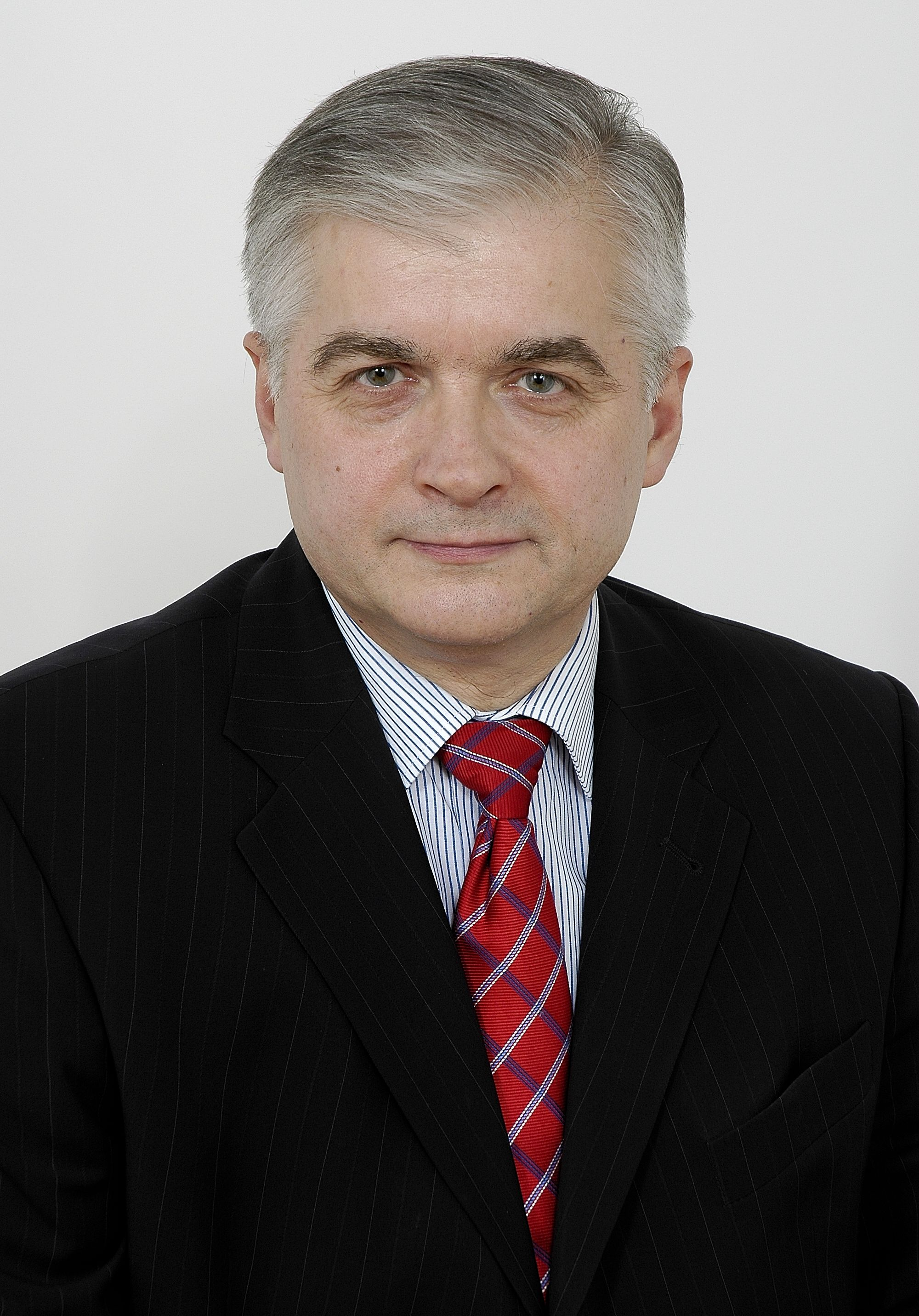
Włodzimierz Cimoszewicz

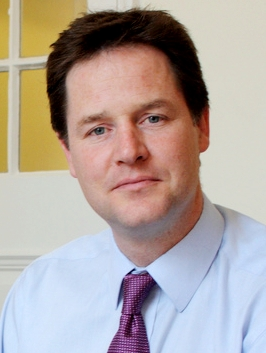
Nick Clegg

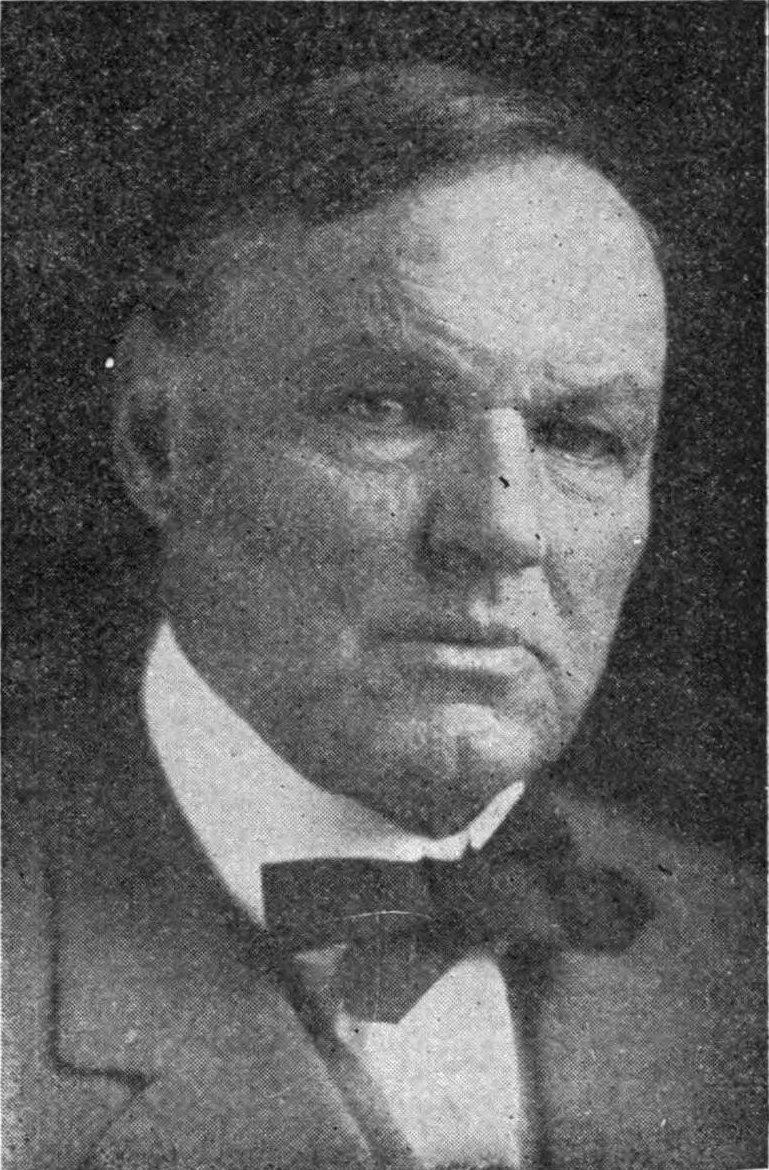
Clarence Darrow

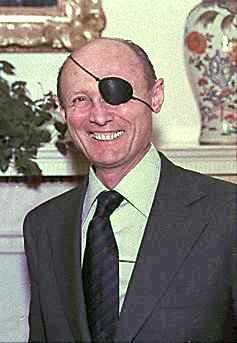
Moshe Dayan

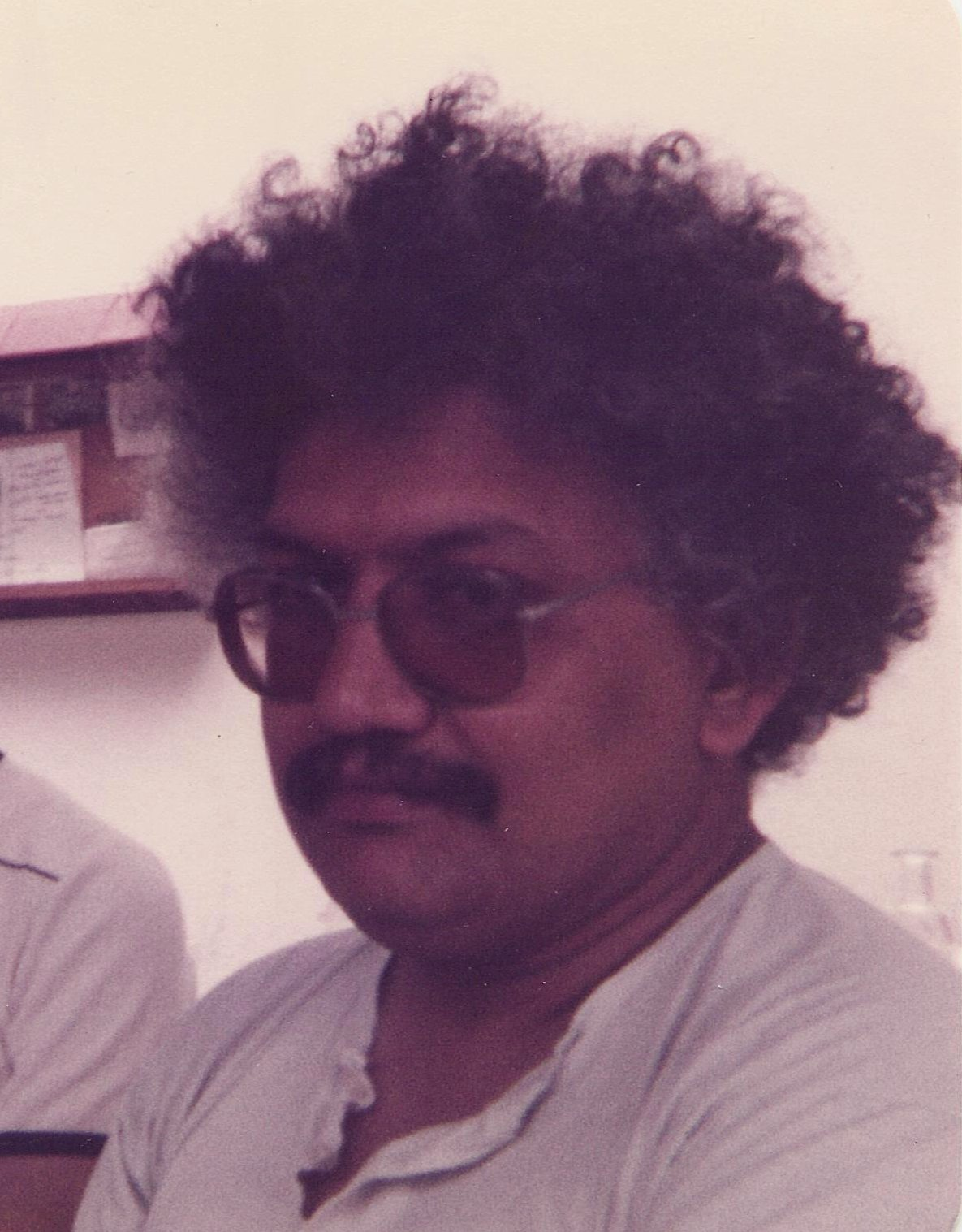
Meghnad Desai

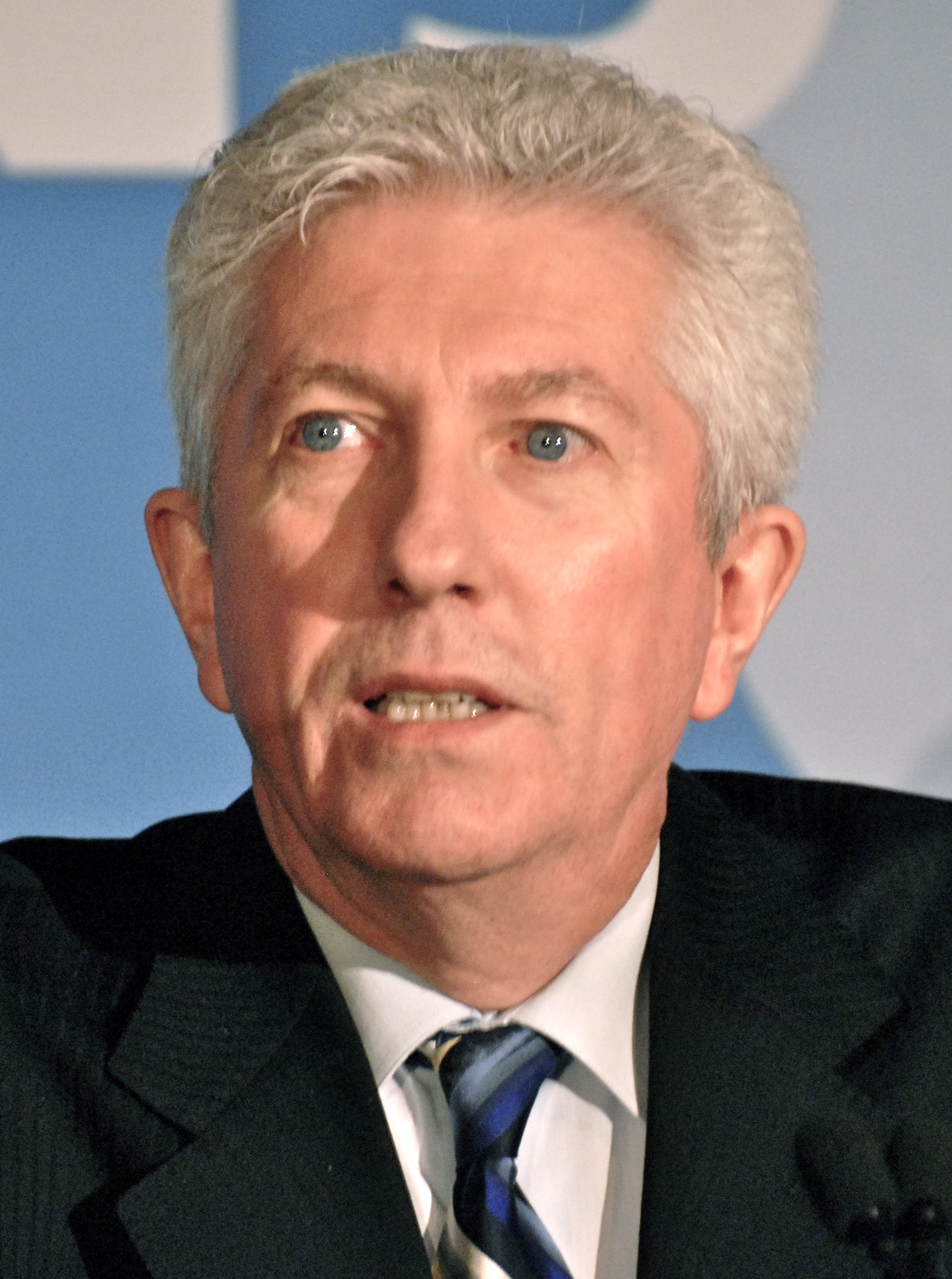
Gilles Duceppe

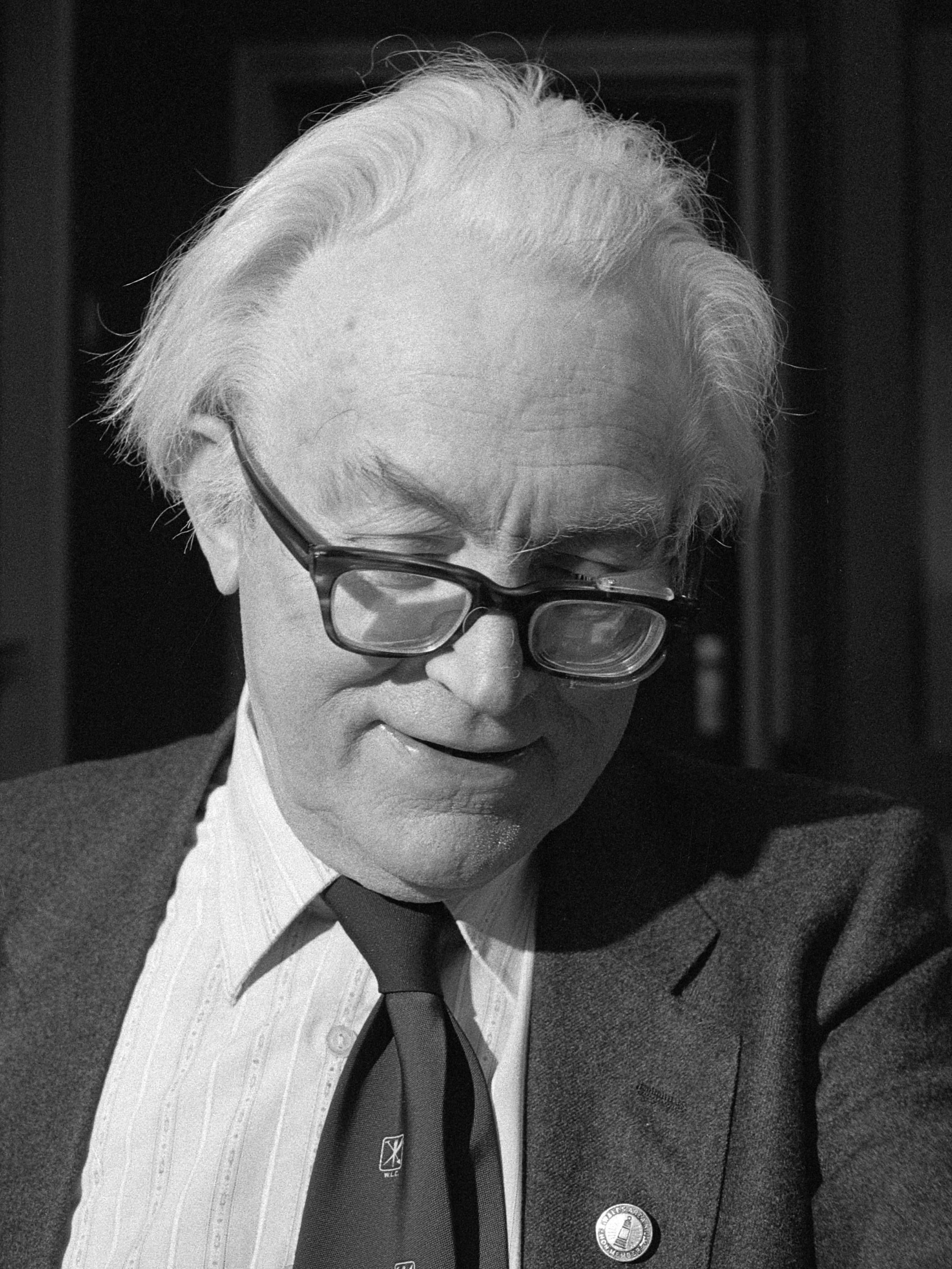
Michael Foot

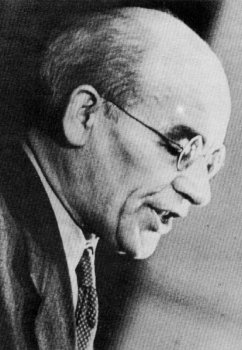
Władysław Gomułka

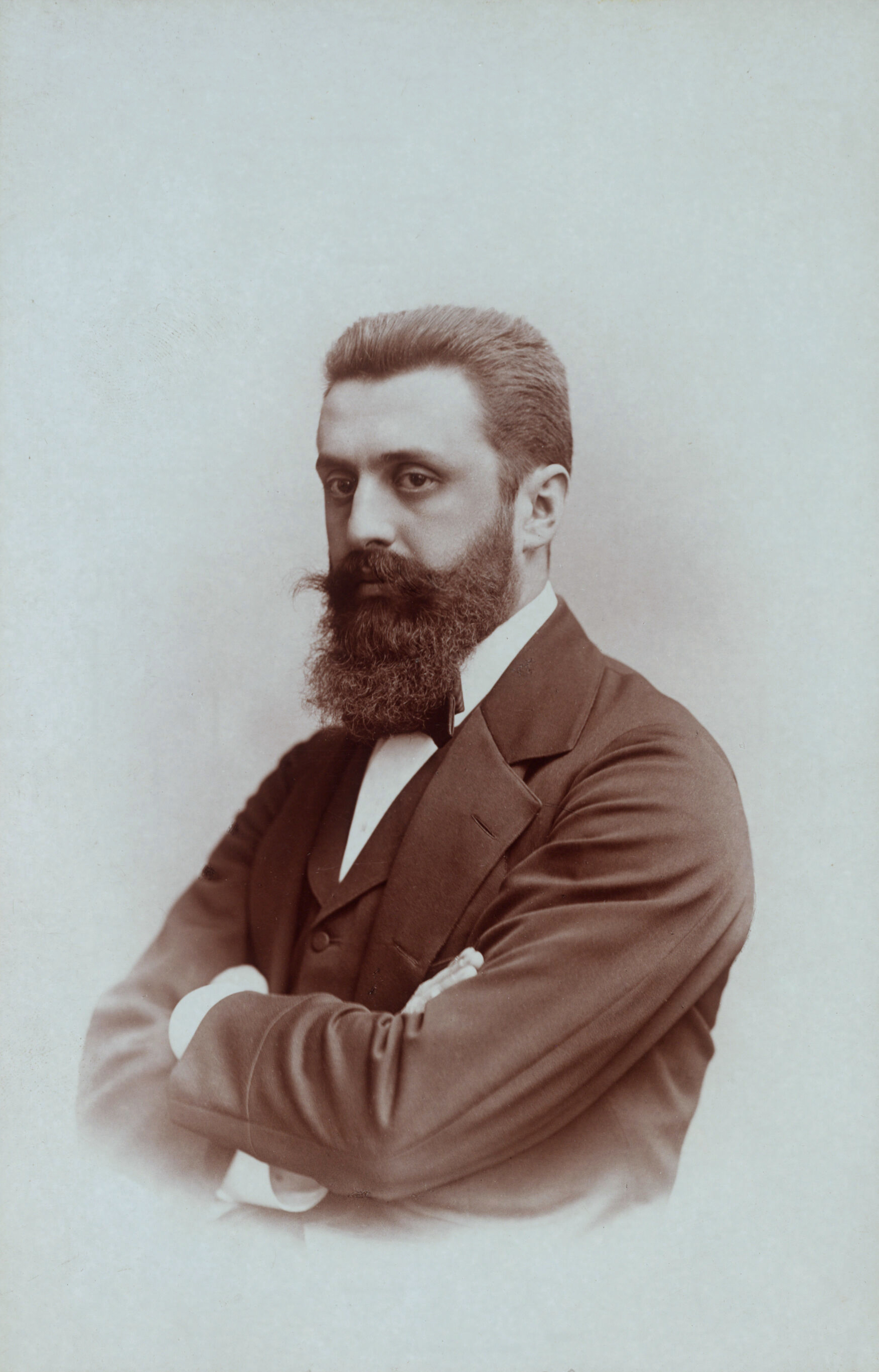
Theodor Herzl

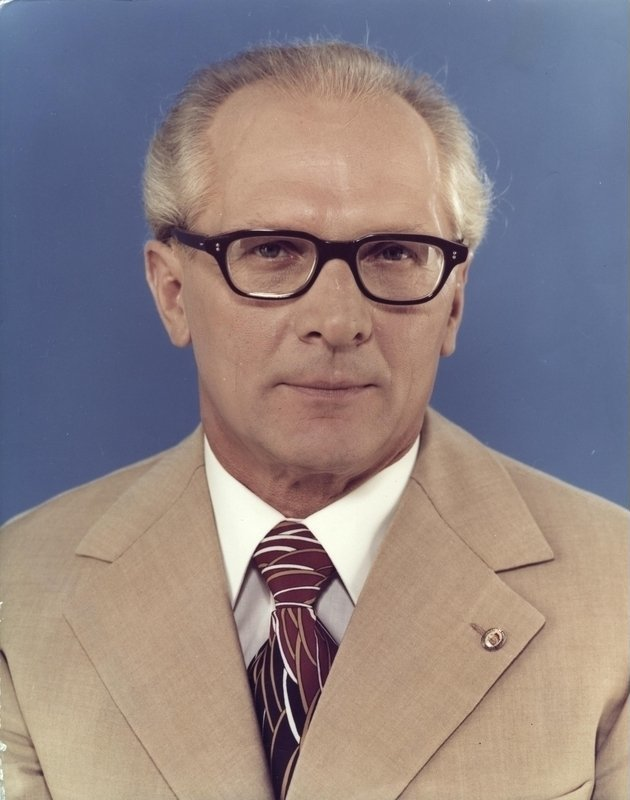
Erich Honecker

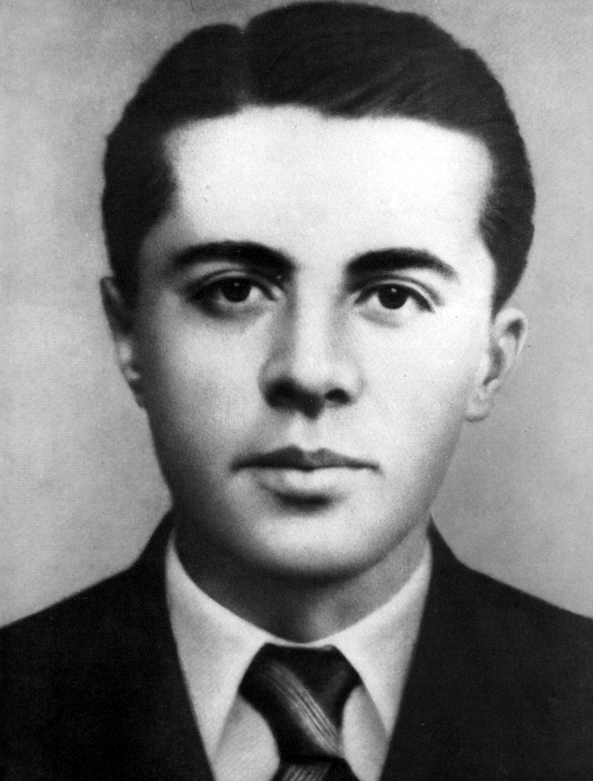
Enver Hoxha

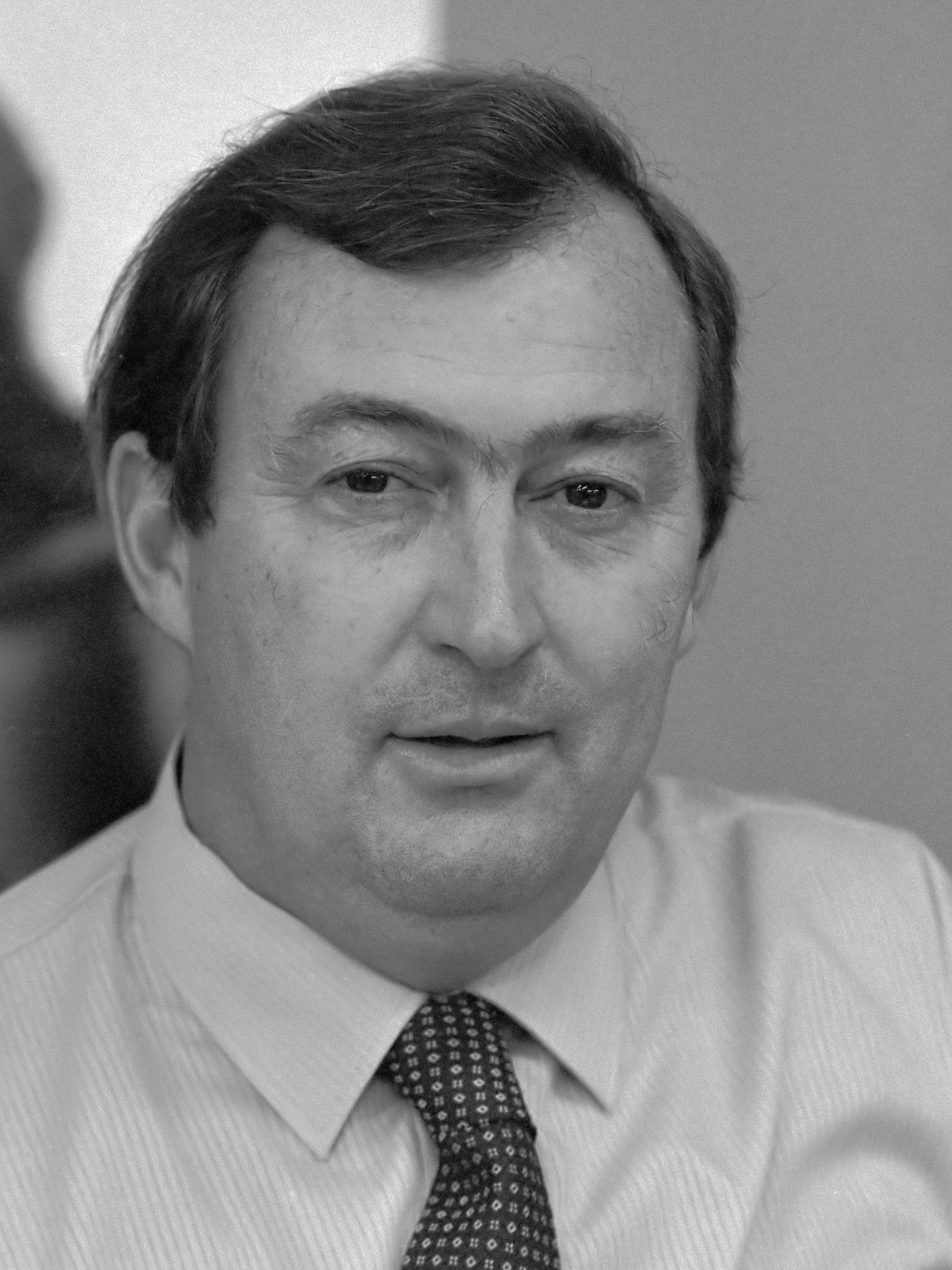
Richard Leakey

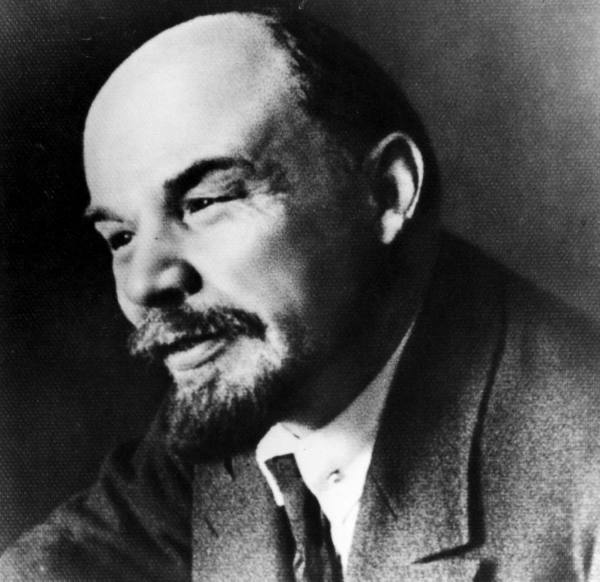
Vladimir Lenin

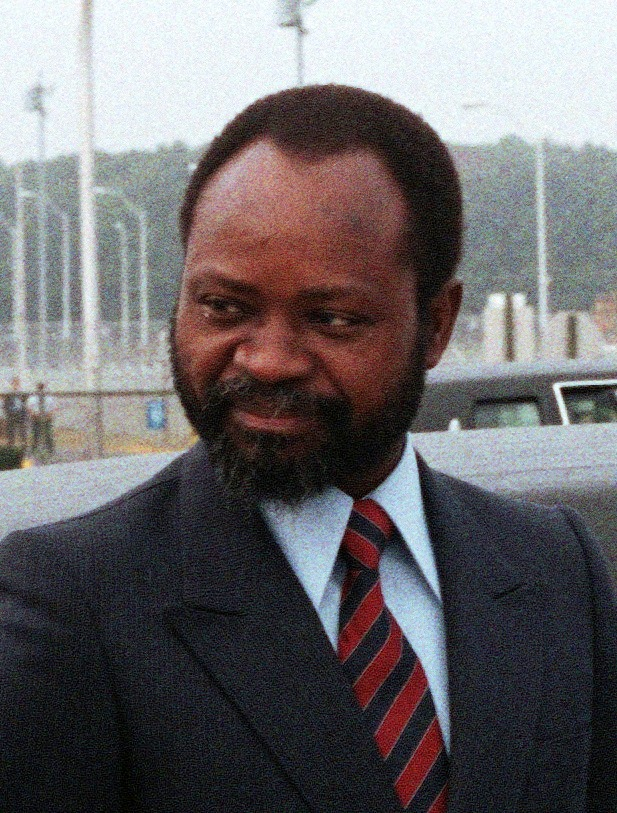
Samora Machel

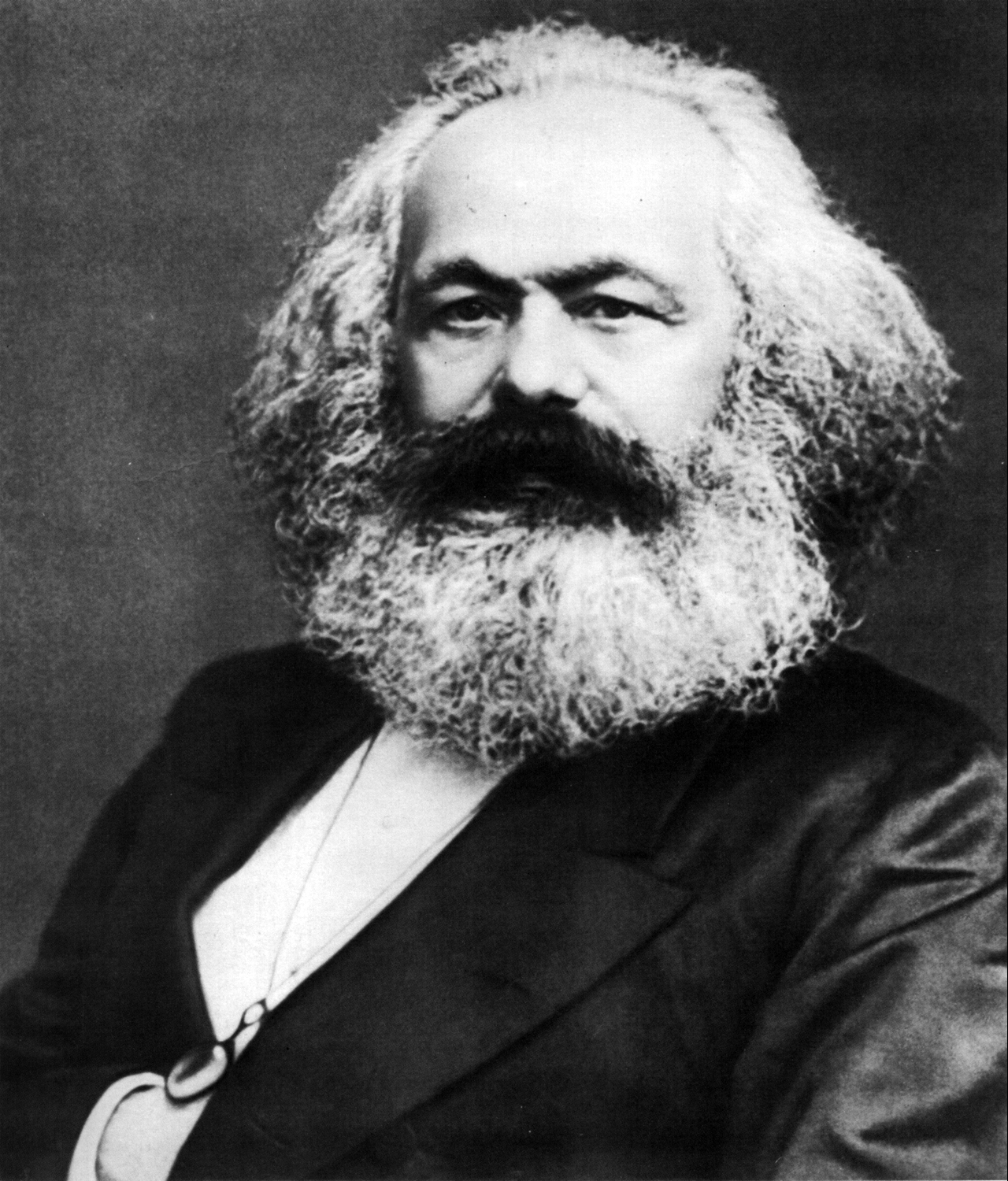
Karl Marx

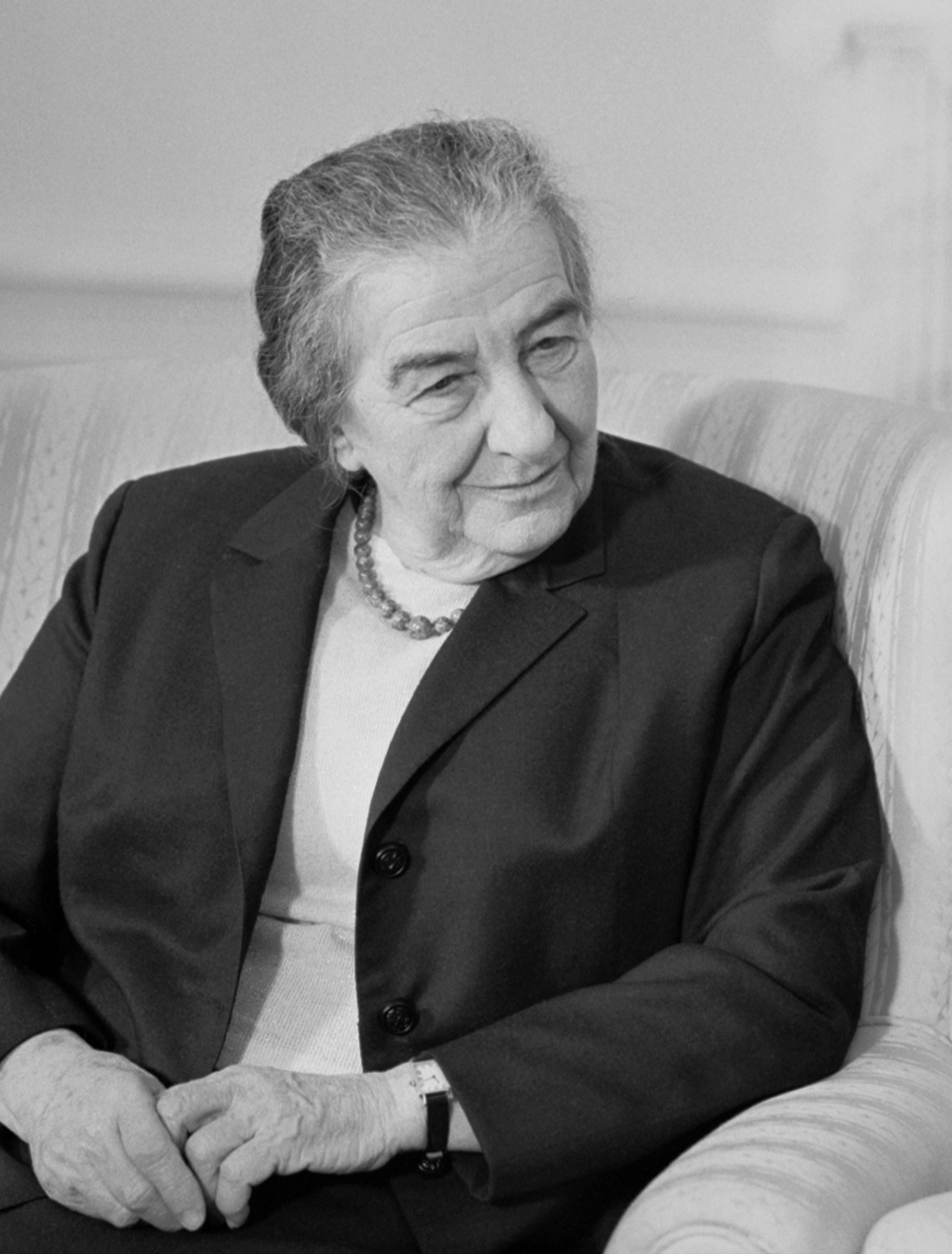
Golda Meir

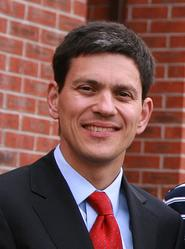
David Miliband

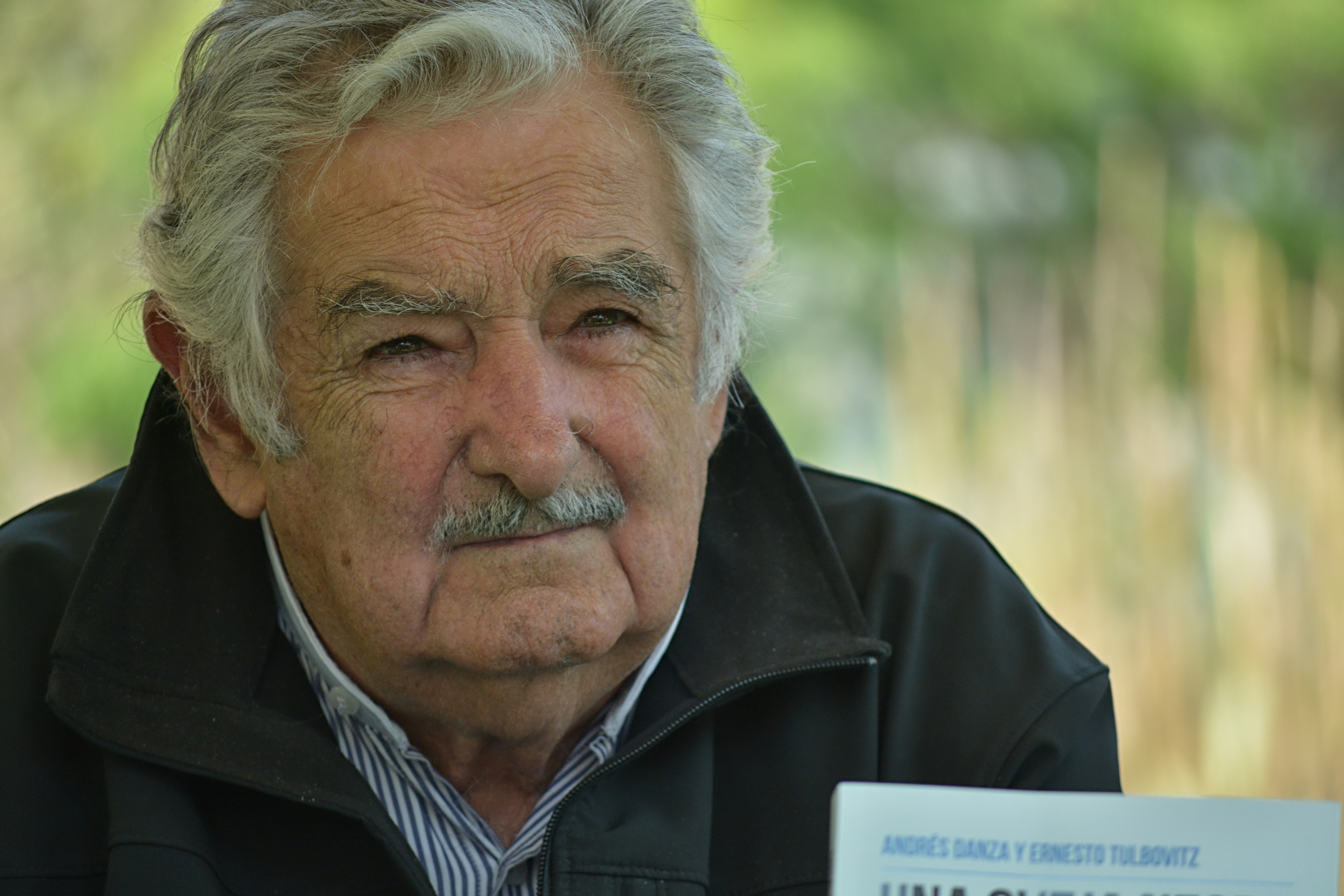
José Mujica

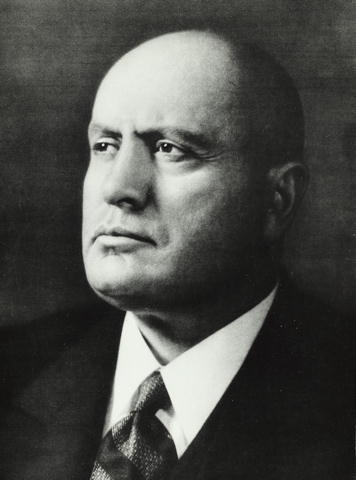
Benito Mussolini

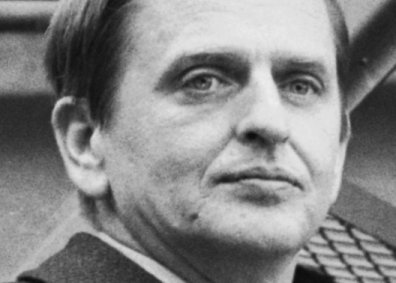
Olof Palme

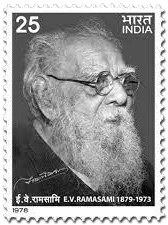
Thanthai Periyar

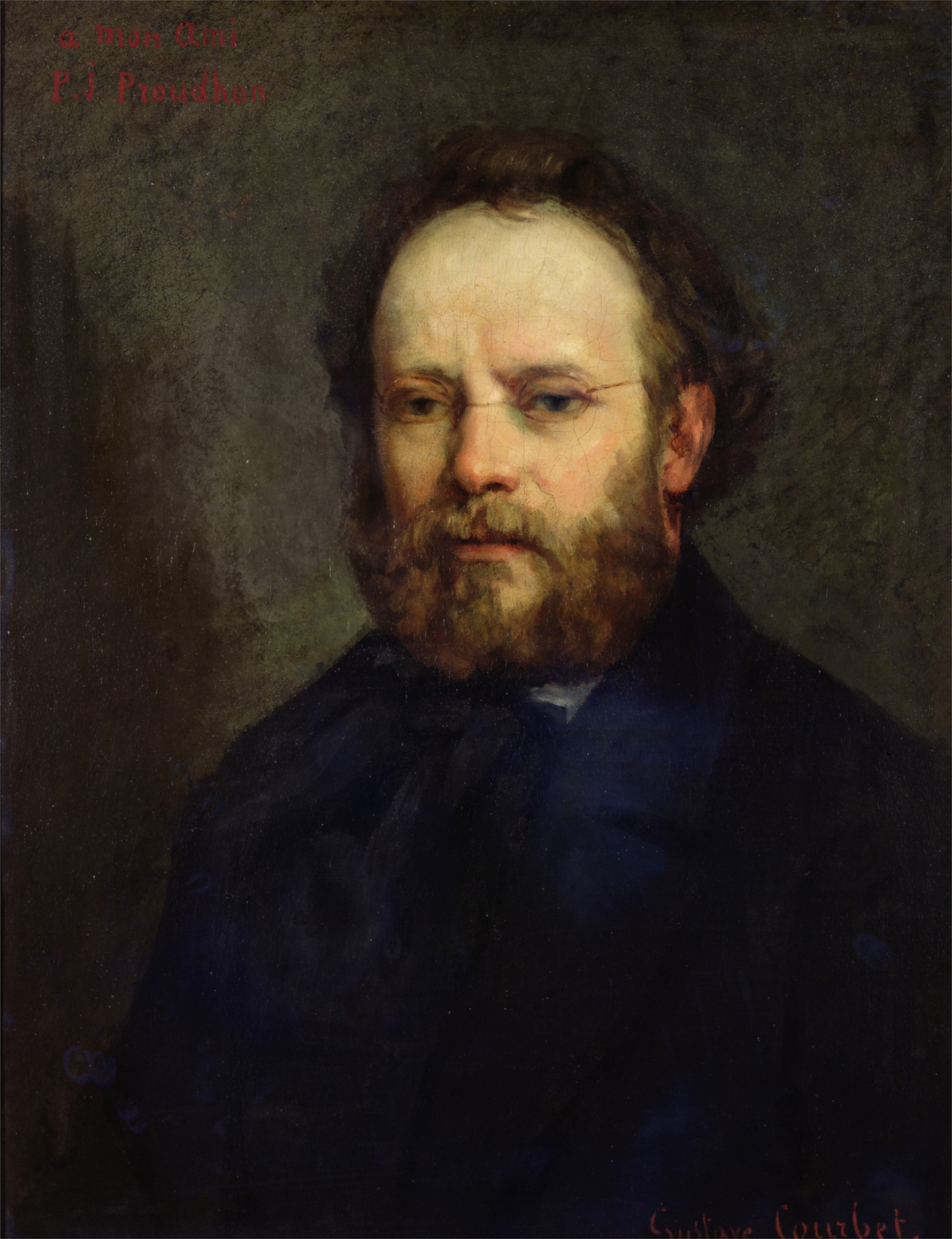
Pierre-Joseph Proudhon

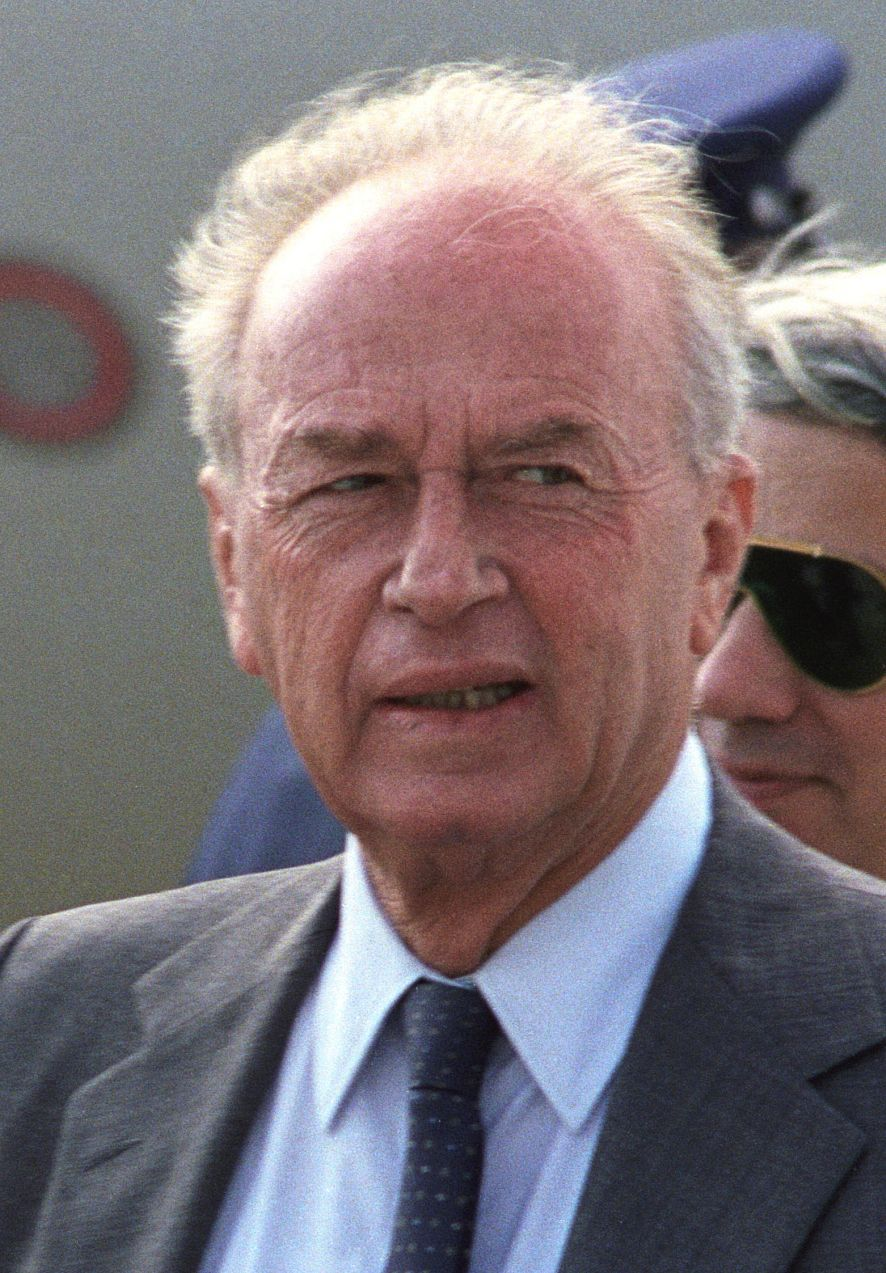
Yitzhak Rabin

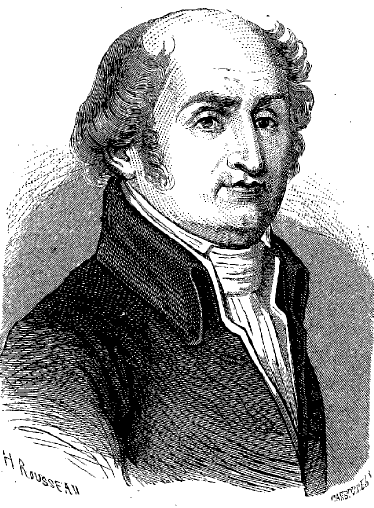
Gilbert Romme

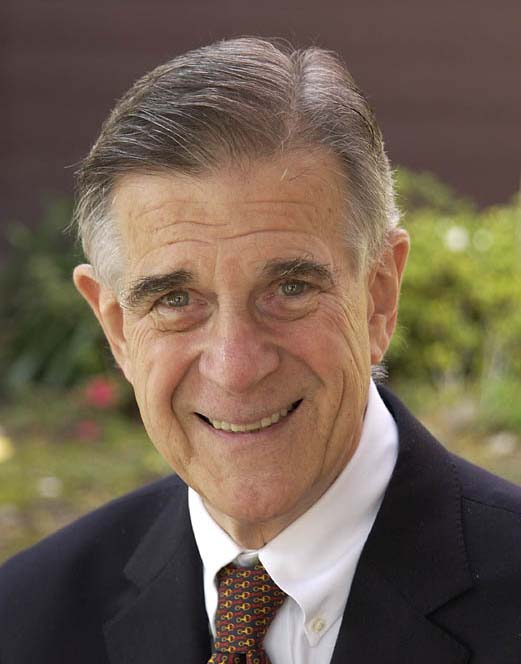
Pete Stark

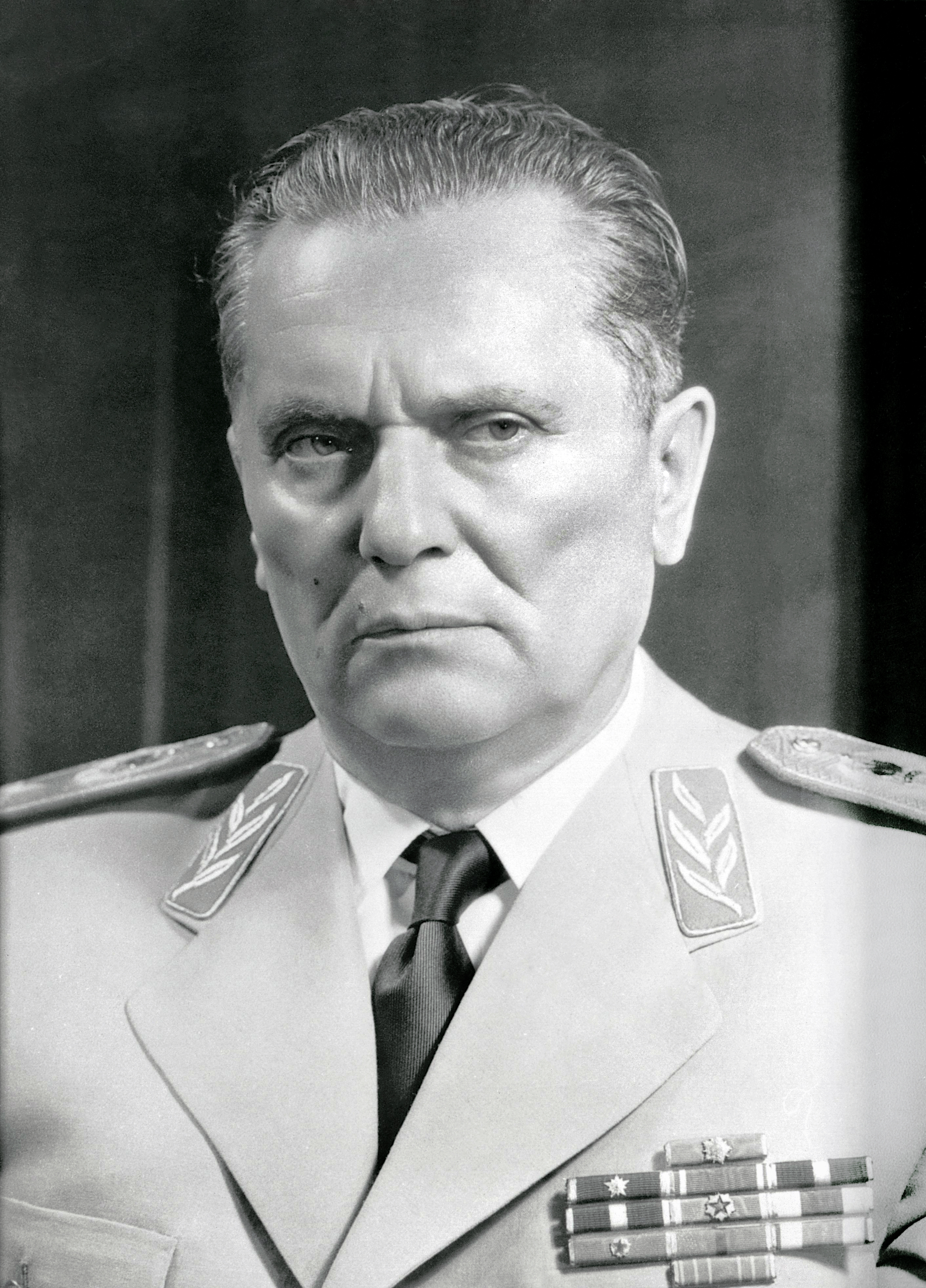
Josip Broz Tito

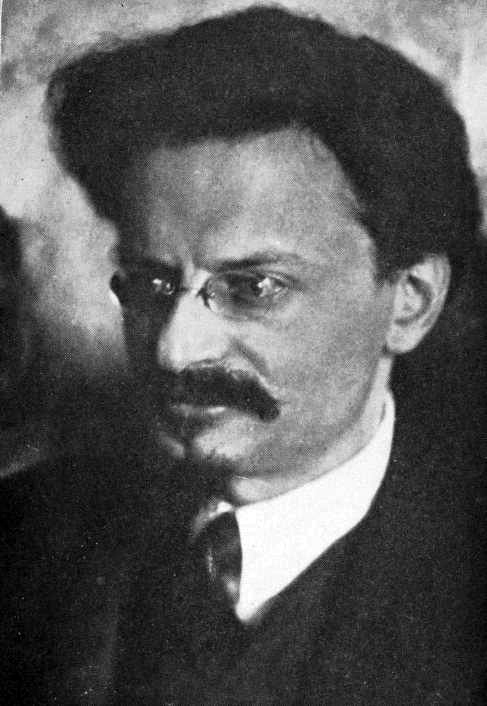
Leon Trotsky

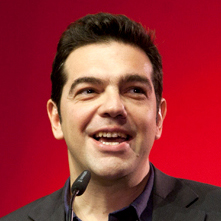
Alexis Tsipras

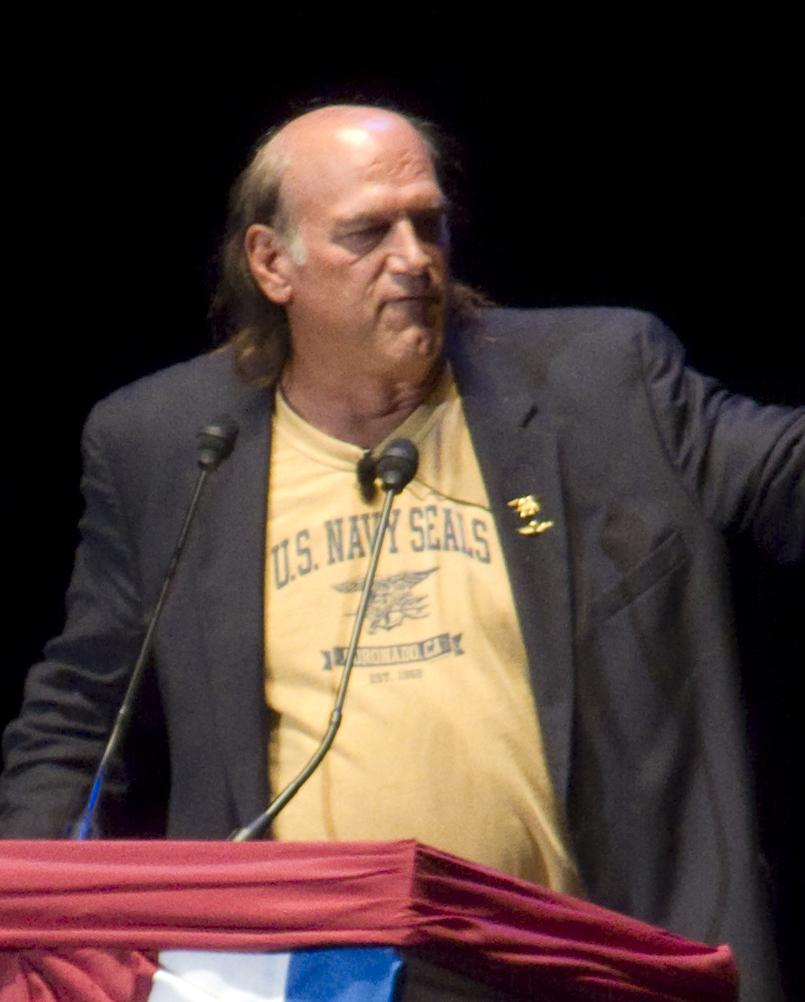
Jesse Ventura

== Africa ==
- Zackie Achmat (1962–): South African anti-Apartheid activist and HIV campaigner
- Kareem Amer (1984–): Egyptian political activist
- Alex Erwin (1948–): South African politician, the country's minister of public enterprises 2004–2009
- Chris Hani (1942–1993): South African anti-Apartheid activist, general secretary of the South African Communist Party 1991–1993, deputy commander of uMkhonto we Sizwe 1987–1992
- Nadine Gordimer (1923–2014): South African anti-Apartheid political activist
- Maikel Nabil Sanad (1985–): Egyptian political activist
- Joe Slovo (1926–1995): South African Communist politician, leader of the South African Communist Party and leading member of the African National Congress
- Ronnie Kasrils (1938–): South African anti-Apartheid politician
- Richard Leakey (1944–2022): Kenyan politician, conservationist and paleoanthropologist
- Samora Moisés Machel (1933–1986): Mozambican socialist revolutionary
- Mengistu Haile Mariam (1937–): Ethiopian politician and military dictator
- Kingunge Ngombale–Mwiru (1930–2018): Tanzanian politician

== Asia ==
=== Cambodia ===
- Pol Pot (1925–1998): Communist politician and dictator of Cambodia, which became an atheist state under his rule

=== China ===
- Xi Jinping (1953–): Chinese politician currently serving as general secretary of the Chinese Communist Party, president of China, and chairman of the Central Military Commission
- Hu Jintao (1942–): Chinese politician; paramount leader of the People's Republic of China 2002–2012; general secretary of the Communist Party 2002–2012; president of China 2003–2012; chairman of the Central Military Commission 2004–2012; member of the Politburo Standing Committee, China's de facto top decision-making body, 1992–2012
- Jiang Zemin (1926–2022): Chinese communist politician, general secretary of the Chinese Communist Party 1989–2002 and president of China 1993–2003. In June 1999, Jiang established an extralegal department, the 6-10 Office, to expel Falun Gong from mainland China. On 20 July, security forces abducted and detained thousands of Falun Gong organizers they identified as leaders. The persecution of Falun Gong that followed was characterized a nationwide campaign of propaganda, as well as the large-scale arbitrary imprisonment and coercive reeducation of Falun Gong organizers, sometimes resulting in death.
- Deng Xiaoping (1904–1997): Chinese politician; paramount leader of China from 1978 until his retirement in 1989
- Mao Zedong (1893–1976): Chinese military and political leader, chairman of the Chinese Communist Party, led the Chinese Communist Party to victory in the Chinese Civil War, leader of the People's Republic of China from its establishment in 1949 until his death in 1976; under his leadership, China officially became an atheist state
- Hua Guofeng (1921–2008): Chinese politician and paramount leader of China until 1978

=== India ===
- Jyoti Basu (1914–2010)
- Buddhadeb Bhattacharjee (1944–2024)
- Manik Sarkar (1949–)
- Periyar E.V. Ramasamy, known as Periyar (1879–1973): Social reformer and politician, the 'Socrates of Southern Asia', who founded the Self-Respect Movement and Dravidar Kazhagam.
- Jawaharlal Nehru (1889–1964): India's first prime minister and a secular-described "scientific humanist" who disavowed belief in gods
- C.N.Annadurai (1909–1969): former chief minister of Tamil Nadu, founder-leader of DMK an offshoot of Dravidar Kazhagam
- Sahodaran Ayyappan (1889–1969): co-founder of the modern atheist movement in Kerala state in India, and minister in Travancore-Cochin government.
- Goparaju Ramachandra Rao, known as Gora (1902–1975): social reformer, founded Atheist Centre on the principles of positive atheism, participated in Indian freedom movement, preached atheism
- Subhashini Ali (1947–): Marxist politician and President of the All India Democratic Women's Association.
- Kanimozhi (1968–): Politician and poet, and daughter of the Tamil Nadu Chief Minister M. Karunanidhi.
- M. Karunanidhi (1924–2018): Ex-Chief Minister of Tamil Nadu.
- M. K. Stalin (1953–): Chief Minister of Tamil Nadu since 2021.
- Manabendra Nath Roy (1887–1954): Born Narendra Nath Bhattacharya, popularly known as M. N. Roy, was a Bengali Indian revolutionary, internationally known political theorist and activist, founder of the Communist parties in Mexico and India. He later denounced communism and became an exponent of the philosophy of radical humanism.
- Bhagat Singh (1907–1931): Marxist revolutionary, wrote a pamphlet entitled Why I am an atheist.
- Harkishan Singh Surjeet (1916–2008): politician, general secretary of the Communist Party of India (Marxist) 199–2005; member of the party's Polit Bureau 1964–2008
- A. K. Gopalan (1904–1977): Communist leader from Kerala
- E. M. S. Namboodiripad (1909–1998): politician, renowned socialist and Marxist theorist, first chief minister of Kerala; leader of the first democratically elected communist government in the world.
- Prakash Karat (1948–): politician, The General Secretary of the Communist Party of India (Marxist) 2005–2015
- Siddaramaiah (1948–): chief minister of Karnataka elected to office in 2013
- E. K. Nayanar (1918–2004): politician, former chief minister of Kerala
- A. K. Antony (1940–): politician, former chief minister of Kerala
- V. S. Achuthanandan (1923–): politician, former chief minister of Kerala
- Pinarayi Vijayan (1944–): politician, current chief minister of Kerala
- Kamal Haasan (1954–): politician, president of Makkal Needhi Maiam, actor
- Udhayanidhi Stalin (1977–): politician, member of the Tamil Nadu Legislative Assembly, son of current Tamil Nadu Chief Minister M. K. Stalin.
- V.T. Balram (1978–): Indian lawmaker representing Indian National Congress who supported Amnesty International in a controversy involving Hindu nationalist student organisation ABVP

=== Japan ===
- Hideki Tojo (1884–1948): politician, military general, and prime minister of Japan 1941–1944; raised Shinto but never really identified with the religion or any belief in gods

=== Middle East ===
- Uri Avnery (1923–2018): German-born Israeli journalist, left-wing peace activist, and former Knesset member
- Ali Al Bukhaiti (1976–): Yemeni politician, journalist, and writer
- David Ben-Gurion (1886–1973): Polish-Israeli politician; a founder and the first Prime Minister of Israel.
- Moshe Dayan (1915–1981): Israeli military leader and politician; fourth chief of staff of the Israel Defense Forces (1953–1958); defense minister and later foreign minister of Israel
- George Hawi (1938–2005): Lebanese politician and former secretary general of the Lebanese Communist Party
- Golda Meir (1898–1978): Israeli politician; fourth prime minister of Israel
- Yitzhak Rabin (1922–1995): Israeli politician, statesman and general; fifth prime minister of Israel; won the 1994 Nobel Peace Prize together with Shimon Peres and Yasser Arafat

=== Mongolia ===
- Khorloogiin Choibalsan (1895–1952): Communist politician and dictator of Mongolia.

=== North Korea ===
- Kim Il Sung (1912–1994): founder of North Korea and the Juche ideology, Supreme Leader 1948–1994
- Kim Jong Il (1942–2011): Supreme Leader 1994–2011
- Kim Jong Un (1983–): Supreme Leader since 2011

=== Vietnam/North Vietnam ===
- Ho Chi Minh (1890–1969): North Vietnamese leader, general secretary of the Communist Party of Vietnam 1956–1960
- Xuan Thuy (1912–1985): North Vietnamese political figure, foreign minister for North Vietnam 1963–65, official leader of the delegation to the secret talks with Henry Kissinger, and the main negotiator at the earliest meetings with Kissinger

== Oceania ==
=== Australia ===
- Montague Miller (1839–1920): unionist, secularist and revolutionary socialist
- William Trenwith (1846–1925): trade union official and labour movement politician
- Frederick Vosper (1869–1901): newspaper journalist and proprietor, and politician, known for his ardent views and support of Australian republicanism, federalism and trade unionism
- Sir John Latham (1877–1964): chief justice of Australia (1935–1952)
- Lionel Murphy (1922–1986): justice of the High Court (1975–1986)
- Bill Hayden (1933–2023): governor-general of Australia (1989–1996) Converted to Catholicism in 2018.
- Alan Carpenter (1957–): premier of Western Australia (2006–2008)
- Julia Gillard (1961–): prime minister of Australia (2010–2013)

=== New Zealand ===
- Norman Douglas (1910–1985): Labour Party politician
- Sir Dove-Myer Robinson (1901–1989): politician, mayor of Auckland 1959–1965 and 1968–1980

== Europe with Russia/USSR ==
=== Albania ===
- Ben Blushi (1969–): politician, former minister, writer and journalist
- Dritëro Agolli (1931–2017): poet, writer and politician
- Diana Çuli (1951–): writer, journalist and politician
- Gilman Bakalli (1967–2016): professor, politician, pundit, and writer
- Enver Hoxha (1908–1985): Communist ruler who declared Albania the first atheist state, and who has been identified as an "arch-atheist"
- Hysen Hoxha (1861–1934): politician, mayor of Gjirokastër, part of the Gjirokastra delegation for the Assembly of Vlorë

=== Belgium ===
- Elio Di Rupo (1951–): Belgian politician, social democratic Belgian prime minister 2011–2014; describes himself as an atheist, rationalist and Freemason
- Fientje Moerman (1958–): liberal politician and current judge on the Constitutional Court of Belgium
- Karel De Gucht (1954–): European commissioner 2009–2014
- Dirk Verhofstadt (1955-): Belgian social liberal theorist
- Siegfried Bracke (1953–): president of the Chamber of Representatives 2014–2019

=== Czech Republic ===
- Petr Pavel (1961–): Czech politician and former army general who is the current president of the Czech Republic; previously served as chairman of the NATO Military Committee 2015–2018, and chief of the General Staff of the Czech Armed Forces 2012–2015

=== Denmark ===
- Edvard Brandes (1847–1931): politician, critic and author, minister of finance 1909–1910 and 1913–1920
- Thorvald Stauning (1873–1943): Prime minister 1924–1926 and 1929–1942.
- Vilhelm Buhl (1881–1954): prime minister May–November 1942 and May–November 1945
- Hans Hedtoft (1903–1955): prime minister 1947–1950 and 1953–1955
- H. C. Hansen (1906–1960): prime minister 1955–1960
- Jens Otto Krag (1914–1978): prime minister 1962–1968 and 1971–1972

=== Finland ===
- Erkki Tuomioja (1946–): politician, Minister of Foreign Affairs 2011–2015
- Rosa Meriläinen (1975–): politician and author
- Jussi Halla-aho (1971–): leader of the Finns Party and member of the European Parliament (MEP)

=== France ===
- Jeannette Bougrab (1973–): lawyer and politician
- Georges Clemenceau (1841–1929): statesman, physician and journalist, prime minister of France 1906–1909 and 1917–1920; led France during World War I and was one of the major proponents of the Treaty of Versailles
- Simone de Beauvoir (1908–1986): French writer, philosopher, political activist, feminist, socialist, and social theorist
- Pierre-Joseph Proudhon (1809–1865): Politician, mutualist philosopher and socialist; member of the French Parliament; first person to call himself an "anarchist"
- Gilbert Romme (1750–1795): politician and mathematician who developed the French Republican Calendar
- Marie-Jean Hérault de Séchelles (1759–1794): 4th and 24th president of the National Convention; first known atheist head of state
- François Hollande (1954–): president of France
- Aristide Briand (1862–1932): French statesman who served eleven terms as prime minister of France during the French Third Republic
- Anne Hidalgo (1959–): Spanish-French politician; mayor of Paris since 2014.
- Clémence Royer (1830–1920): French scholar who lectured and wrote on economics, philosophy, science, and feminism

=== Germany ===
- Sabine Jünger (1973–): German politician for The Left Party.PDS
- Willibald Hentschel (1858–1947): German agrarian and volkisch writer and political activist
- Martin Bormann (1900–1945): Nazi official and right-hand man of Adolf Hitler
- Friedrich Engels (1820–1895): 19th-century philosopher and political scientist, often regarded as the co-founder of Communism
- Erich Honecker (1912–1994): Communist politician and leader of East Germany.
- Karl Marx (1818–1883): 19th-century philosopher, political economist, sociologist, political theorist, often called the father of Communism
- Friedrich Ebert (1871–1925): German politician of the Social Democratic Party (SPD) and the first president of Germany from 1919 until his death in office in 1925
- Alfred Rosenberg (1893–1946): Nazi official and leader of NSDAP Office of Foreign Affairs
- Ali Al-Dailami (1981–): German-Yemeni politician from DIE LINKE
- Joseph Goebbels (1897–1945): Nazi official and propaganda minister; criticized organized religion in his writings and has often been declared an antitheist
- Kurt Schumacher (1895–1952): social democratic politician who served as chairman of the Social Democratic Party of Germany from 1946; the first leader of the Opposition in the West German Bundestag from 1949 until his death
- Carl Vogt (1817–1895): German scientist, philosopher, popularizer of science, and politician who emigrated to Switzerland
- Julius Streicher (1885–1946): Nazi official
- Olaf Scholz (1958–): German politician from the Social Democratic Party, former chancellor of Germany
- Walter Ulbricht (1893–1973): Communist politician and leader of East Germany
- Albert Speer (1905–1981): Nazi official, was communed during Nuremberg Trials though authenticity is debated
- Sahra Wagenknecht (1969–): Left-wing politician (Die Linke)
- Johann Most (1846–1906): German-American Social Democratic and then anarchist politician, newspaper editor, and orator
- Adolf Eichmann (1906–1962): Nazi official
- Gregor Gysi (1948–): Lawyer and Member of the German Bundestag (Die Linke)

=== Greece ===
- Alexis Tsipras (1974–): Leader of Syriza and prime minister of Greece 2015–2019
- Yanis Varoufakis (1961–): minister of finance 27 January 2015 – 6 July 2015

=== Ireland ===
- Clare Daly (1968–): former Teachta Dála and MEP
- Jim Kemmy (1936–1997): Socialist politician.
- Ivana Bacik (1968–): politician, current Teachta Dála and leader of the Labour Party, former senator and deputy leader of the Seanad
- Proinsias De Rossa (1940–): politician, former president of the Workers' Party, leader of Democratic Left, and later a senior member of the Labour Party
- Hanna Sheehy-Skeffington (1877–1946): suffragist and nationalist
- Owen Sheehy-Skeffington (1909–1970): university lecturer and senator
- William Thompson (1775–1833): Socialist and economist
- Joe Higgins (1949–): Socialist Party politician; elected to Dáil Éireann as Teachta Dála (TD) for the Dublin West constituency in 2011, having previously served in that capacity 1997–2007; member of the European Parliament (MEP) for the Dublin constituency 2009–2011, the first Socialist Party MEP

=== Italy ===
- Giorgio Napolitano (1925–2023): politician, 11th president of Italy
- Sandro Pertini (1896–1990): politician, 7th president of Italy
- Giuseppe Saragat (1898–1988): politician, 5th president of Italy
- Massimo D'Alema (1949–): politician, 53rd prime minister 1998–2000, minister of foreign affairs and deputy prime minister in the Prodi II Cabinet 2006–2008
- Giuliano Ferrara (1952–): politician, journalist, and occasional talk show host
- Antonio Gramsci (1891–1936): Marxist philosopher, and founding member and one-time leader of the Italian Communist Party
- Nilde Iotti (1920–1999): politician, the first woman to become president of the Italian Chamber of Deputies for three consecutive legislatures 1979–1992.
- Pietro Nenni (1891–1980): politician, the leader of Italian Socialist Party 1931–1945 and 1949–1963, deputy prime minister (Moro I, II and III cabinet), minister of foreign affairs (De Gasperi II cabinet, Rumor I cabinet)
- Benito Mussolini (1883–1945): fascist dictator of Italy.
- Palmiro Togliatti (1893–1964): politician, the leader of Italian Communist Party from 1927 to his death in 1964
- Enrico Berlinguer (1922–1984): politician, leader of Italian Communist Party from 1972 to his death in 1984
- Emma Bonino (1948–2026): politician, European Commissioner 1995–1999, minister of foreign trade and European affairs 2006–2008, deputy speaker of Italian Senate 2008–2013, minister of foreign affairs 2013–2014

=== The Netherlands ===
- Jetta Klijnsma (1957–): Dutch politician from the Labour Party serving as the King's Commissioner of Drenthe since 2017
- Clara Wichmann (1885–1922): German–Dutch lawyer, writer, anarcho-syndicalist, feminist, and atheist
- Renske Leijten (1979–): politician of the Socialist Party, member of the House of Representatives since 2006
- Thierry Baudet (1983–): Dutch politician, academic, author, founder, and leader of Forum for Democracy (FvD), member of the House of Representatives since 2017
- Ronald Plasterk (1957–): politician of the Labour Party (PvdA) and former molecular geneticist, minister of the interior and kingdom relations in the Cabinet Rutte II, previously minister of education, culture and science 2007–2010 in the Cabinet Balkenende IV
- Lousewies van der Laan (1966–): retired Dutch politician of the Democrats 66 (D66) party and jurist
- Stephan van Baarle (1991–): politician of the DENK party; member of the House of Representatives since 2021; serving on the Rotterdam municipal council since 2018
- Geert Wilders (1963–): Dutch businessman and politician; leader of the Party for Freedom (Partij voor de Vrijheid – PVV) since he founded it in 2006

=== Poland ===
- Władysław Gomułka (1905–1982): Communist leader
- Aleksander Kwaśniewski (1954–): former president of Poland (1995–2005)
- Zbigniew Religa (1938–2009): prominent cardiac surgeon, pioneer in human heart transplantation and minister of health of the Republic of Poland
- Włodzimierz Cimoszewicz (1950–): former prime minister of Poland (1996–1997)
- Leszek Miller (1946–): Prime Minister of Poland (2001-2004)
- Kazimierz Kutz (1929–2018): filmmaker, writer, academic, Senator (1997-2007, 2011–2015) and Sejm member (2007-2011)
- Jacek Kuroń (1934–2004): political activist, presidential candidate, Minister of Labour and Social Policy (1989–1990, 1992–1993) and Sejm member (1989-2001)
- Mariusz Kamiński (1965–): Minister of the Interior and Administration (2019-)
- Michał Kamiński (1972–): MEP (2004–2007, 2009–2014), Sejm member (1997-2004, 2015–2019) and senator
- Gabriel Narutowicz (1865–1922): first president of Poland (1922)
- Robert Biedroń (1975–): mayor of Słupsk, member of parliament, LGBT rights activist
- Bolesław Bierut (1892–1956): Communist leader

=== Portugal ===
- Ana Gomes (1954–): ambassador and former MEP and presidential candidate of the Socialist Party
- António Marinho e Pinto (1950–): former President of the Portuguese Bar Association and MEP for the Earth Party, and founder of the Democratic Republican Party.
- Francisco Louçã (1956–): former councillor of state, MP and leader of the Left Bloc
- Isabel Moreira (1976–): jurist and Socialist Party MP
- João Soares (1949–): former state councillor, minister of culture and mayor of Lisbon of the Socialist Party.
- Jorge Sampaio (1939–2021): lawyer, President of Portugal (1996–2006) and Mayor of Lisbon of the Socialist Party.
- Manuel Soares (1964–): judge and President of the Portuguese Judges' Union.
- Miguel Portas (1958–2012): former Left Bloc MEP
- Paula Teixeira da Cruz (1960–): lawyer and former Minister of Justice of the Social Democratic Party.
- Teófilo Braga (1843–1924): president of Portugal (1910–1911, 1915) of the Republican Party and the Democratic Party.

=== Romania ===
- Mihai Ralea (1896–1964): social scientist, cultural journalist, and political figure that was affiliated with Poporanism, the left-wing agrarian movement.
- Remus Cernea (1974–): activist against discrimination based on faith and religion, an advocate of the separation of church and state
- Nicolae Ceaușescu (1918–1989): Romanian communist dictator
- Paul Georgescu (1923–1989): Romanian literary critic, journalist, fiction writer and communist political figure.
- Alexandru Drăghici (1913–1993): Communist activist and politician.

=== Russia/Soviet Union ===
- Leonid Brezhnev (1906–1982): Soviet politician, leader of the Soviet Union from 1964 until his death in 1982
- Mikhail Gorbachev (1931–2022): Soviet politician, leader of the Soviet Union from 1985 until his resignation in 1991; although he was suspected to be a "closeted Christian", he always denied that and kept reaffirming his atheism
- Vladimir Ilyich Lenin (1870–1924): Marxist revolutionary and leader of the Bolsheviks; considered atheism and anti-religious propaganda to be essential to promoting communism
- Nikita Khrushchev (1894–1971): Soviet general secretary, 1953–1964.
- Joseph Stalin (1878–1953): general secretary of the Communist Party of the Soviet Union's Central Committee from 1922 until his death in 1953
- Leon Trotsky (1879–1940): Marxist theorist and Soviet politician.
- Yemelyan Yaroslavsky (1878–1943): Bolshevik revolutionary and founder of the League of Militant Atheists.

=== Spain ===
Non-religious politicians are very common in Spain, particularly in PSOE, Unidas Podemos, and the former Republican Left.

- Santiago Casares Quiroga (1884–1950): politician, prime minister of Spain May 13–July 19, 1936
- Pedro Sánchez (1972–): politician, prime minister of Spain since June 1, 2018.
- Manuel Azaña (1880–1940): prime minister of Spain, 1931–1936
- Pablo Iglesias (1978–): second deputy prime minister of Spain 2020–2021, secretary-general (leader) of Podemos since 2014

=== Sweden ===
- Olof Palme (1927–1986): politician, two-term prime minister of Sweden, heading a Privy Council Government 1969–1976 and a cabinet government from 1982 until his death
- Bengt Westerberg (1943–): leader of the Liberal People's Party 1983–1995; minister for social affairs and deputy prime minister 1991–1994; current deputy president of the International Federation of Red Cross and Red Crescent Societies in Geneva, Switzerland
- Hanif Bali (1987–): politician of the Moderate Party and member of the Swedish Riksdag
- Magdalena Andersson (1967-): politician, 1st female prime minister of Sweden 2021–2022, leader of the Swedish Social Democratic Party and incumbent leader of the Opposition

=== Turkey ===
- Abdullah Cevdet (1869–1932), Turkish intellectual and physician of ethnic Kurdish descent, who was a politician of the Committee of Union and Progress between 1889 and 1908 and then the Ottoman Democratic Party between 1908 and 1911.
- Behice Boran (1910–1987), Turkish Marxist politician, author, and sociologist, who was elected deputy of the Workers' Party of Turkey between 1965 and 1969.
- Bedri Baykam (1957–), Turkish artist and elected member of the Party Assembly of the social-democratic Republican People's Party between 1995 and 1998.
- Ahmet Şık (1970–), Turkish journalist and member of parliament.

=== United Kingdom ===
Being non-religious has traditionally not been a barrier to success in British politics, as evidenced by at least seven prime ministers, one deputy prime minister, several first ministers of Wales and Scotland, and multiple leaders of the Opposition being atheists since the 20th century. Non-religious views are common among British MPs and Lords, many of whom are members of the All-Party Parliamentary Humanist Group, as well as members of Scottish, Welsh, Northern Irish, and London legislatures.

==== Prime ministers ====
- David Lloyd George (1863–1945): Welsh Liberal politician; prime minister of the United Kingdom 1915–1922; sometimes described as an agnostic or deist; oversaw disestablishment in Wales
- Ramsay MacDonald: Scottish Labour politician who served as prime minister of the United Kingdom 1929–1935; previously chair or president of Humanists UK (1902 and 1904)
- Neville Chamberlain: Conservative British politician who served as prime minister of the United Kingdom 1937–1940; raised by an atheist father and a nontheist Unitarian mother, he was described as a "reverent agnostic" and someone who never practiced or showed interest in religion at any time in his life
- Winston Churchill: Conservative British prime minister 1940–1945 and 1951–1955; an atheist who said "I do not accept the Christian or any other form of religious belief" but not a secularist, saying he supported the established church "from the outside"; he likened religion in general to a "dangerous narcotic" and said he thought death meant simply "black velvet - eternal sleep"
- Clement Attlee (1883–1967): British politician who served as prime minister of the United Kingdom 1945–1951, leader of the Labour Party 1935–1955
- James Callaghan: Welsh Labour prime minister 1976–1979; an atheist since his teenage years according to multiple biographers and friends at the time
- Keir Starmer (1962–): leader of the Labour Party (UK) and prime minister of the United Kingdom 2024–2026

==== First ministers ====
- Donald Dewar (1937–2000): British politician, Scottish first minister from May 1999 until his sudden death in October 2000
- Rhodri Morgan (1939–2017), former first minister of Wales and leader of Welsh Labour (2000–2009)
- Mark Drakeford: Labour first minister of Wales 2018–2024

==== Leaders of the Opposition ====
- Michael Foot (1913–2010): British politician and writer, leader of the Labour Party 1980–1983.
- Neil Kinnock PC (1942–): British Labour politician, Leader of the Opposition and Labour Party leader 1983–1992.
- Ed Miliband (1969–): British Labour politician, leader of the Opposition and leader of the Labour Party 2010–2015
- Kemi Badenoch (1980–): British Conservative politician and Leader of the Opposition since 2024; describes herself as "agnostic" and a non-theist but "culturally Christian";has some affinity for the Catholic Church, calling herself an "honorary Catholic"

==== Others ====
- William Crawford Anderson (1877–1919): British socialist politician, a founder member of the Union of Democratic Control
- James Arbuthnot (1952–): Conservative MP 1987–2015 and peer since 2015
- Edward Aveling (1849–1898): English Marxist activist and partner of Karl Marx's daughter Eleanor.
- Bessie Braddock JP (1899–1970): British Labour politician, vice-chairman of the party in 1968.
- Charles Bradlaugh (1833–1891): Liberal politician; one of the most famous English atheists of the 19th century
- Alastair Campbell (1957–): director of communications and strategy for the prime minister of the United Kingdom 1997–2003
- James Cleverly (1969–): MP for Braintree 2015–present; briefly served as Education Secretary of the United KingdomeEducation secretary from July to September 2022 before becoming foreign secretary and, after a reshuffle, home secretary
- Michael Cashman (1950–): British actor turned Labour politician, former member of the European Parliament (1999–2014)
- Colin Challen (1953–): British Labour politician, member of Parliament (2001–2010)
- Charles Clarke (1950–): British Labour Party politician, member of Parliament since 1997, former home secretary
- Nick Clegg (1967–): former deputy prime minister of the United Kingdom, lord president of the Council (with special responsibility for political and constitutional reform), and the British Liberal Democrat leader 2007–2015
- Robin Cook (1946–2005): secretary of state for foreign & commonwealth affairs of the UK (1997–2001), whose funeral service was held in the High Kirk of Scotland, where he was described as a "Presbyterian atheist"
- Meghnad Desai, Baron Desai (1940–): British economist, writer and Labour politician
- Frank Dobson (1940–2019): British Labour politician and member of Parliament for Holborn and St. Pancras
- Jack Dormand (1919–2003): British educationist and Labour politician.
- Herbert Fisher OM (1865–1940): English historian, educator, and Liberal politician.
- Donald Findlay QC (1951–): Senior Scottish advocate and Queen's Counsel.
- Shreela Flather, Baroness Flather (1934–): British Conservative peer in the House of Lords, the first Asian woman to receive a peerage.
- Sir George Taubman Goldie (1846–1925): Manx administrator who, as founder of the Royal Niger Company, played a major role in the founding of Nigeria.
- Evan Harris (1965–): British Liberal Democrat politician and former MP.
- Roy Hattersley PC (1932–): British Labour Party politician, author and journalist, Deputy Leader of the Labour Party 1983–1992.
- Douglas Houghton PC CH (1898–1996): British Labour politician.
- Robert Hughes, Baron Hughes of Woodside (1932–2022): British Labour politician.
- Tommy Jackson (1879–1955): English founder of the Socialist Party of Great Britain and later the Communist Party of Great Britain.
- Joel Joffe, Baron Joffe CBE (1932–2017): South Africa-born British Labour peer in the House of Lords.
- Oona King, Baroness King of Bow (1967–): Labour peer in the House of Lords, former MP for Bethnal Green and Bow (1997–2005).
- Ken Livingstone (1945–): Mayor of London 2000–08.
- Gus Macdonald, Baron Macdonald of Tradeston CBE, PC (1940–): British Labour politician.
- John Maxton, Baron Maxton (1936–): Scottish politician, MP and now member of the House of Lords.
- David Miliband (1965–): British Labour politician, foreign secretary 2007–2010
- Julie Morgan (1941–): Welsh Assembly Member for Cardiff North and former MP for Cardiff North.
- John Morley, 1st Viscount Morley of Blackburn OM, PC (1838–1923): British Liberal statesman, writer and newspaper editor.
- Mo Mowlam (1949–2005): Former Secretary of State for Northern Ireland.
- Elaine Murphy, Baroness Murphy (1949–2005): British politician and a member of the House of Lords, and a doctor and academic, formerly Professor of Psychiatry of Old Age at Guy's Hospital.
- Marion Phillips (1881–1932): Australia-born Labour Party politician and British Member of Parliament.
- Phil Piratin (1907–1995): British member of the Communist Party of Great Britain (CPGB) and one of their few Members of Parliament.
- Herbert Samuel, 1st Viscount Samuel (1870–1963): Liberal Party Leader 1931–1935.
- Phil Sawford (1950–): British politician and former Member of Parliament for Kettering.
- Brian Sedgemore (1937–2015): former left-wing British Labour Party politician.
- Clare Short (1946–): British politician, former Labour Secretary of State for International Development.
- Dennis Skinner (1932–): British politician, Labour member of Parliament for Bolsover from 1970 until he lost his seat in 2019
- Guy Aldred (1886–1963): English anarchist communist and a prominent member of the Anti-Parliamentary Communist Federation.
- Peter Tatchell (1952–), Australian-born British human rights activist
- Phillip Whitehead (1937–2005): British Labour politician, television producer and writer.

=== Other in Europe ===
- Gaudenz Canova (1887–1962): Swiss lawyer and Social Democratic member of the National Council of Switzerland from Graubünden (Grisons).
- Dimitris Christofias (1946–2019): Greek Cypriot politician, President of Cyprus 2008–2013.
- Vaso Čubrilović (1897–1990): Bosnian student, a conspirator in the assassination of Archduke Franz Ferdinand of Austria.
- Peđa Grbin (1979–): Croatian politician and president of Social Democratic Party of Croatia (2020-2024), mayor of Pula science 2025
- Theodor Herzl (1860–1904): Austro-Hungarian Jewish journalist and founder of modern political Zionism.
- Zoran Janković (1953–): Slovenian businessman, former mayor of Ljubljana, the capital of Slovenia, and a deputy.
- Alexander Lukashenko (1954–): President of Belarus, describes himself as "an Orthodox atheist."
- Slobodan Milošević (1941–2006): Serbian politician, former President of Serbia and of Yugoslavia.
- Ivica Puljak (1969–): Croatian politician, particle physicist, professor at University of Split's FESB division and mayor of Split (2021-2025)
- Ivica Račan (1944–2007): Prime Minister of Croatia (2000–2003), former Croatian leftist politician who led the Social Democratic Party of Croatia between 1989 up to 2007. He was also the last leader and democratic transformer of the League of Communists of Croatia.
- Hedi Stadlen (1916–2004): Austrian Jewish political activist, philosopher and musicologist.
- Veton Surroi (1961–): Kosovo Albanian publicist and politician.
- Josip Broz Tito (1892–1980) 1st President of Yugoslavia
- Zoran Milanović (1966–): Prime Minister of Croatia (2011-2016) and 5th President of Croatia (2020-)
- Miloš Zeman (1944–): President of the Czech Republic

== North America ==
=== Canada ===
- Armin Navabi (1983–): Iranian Canadian ex-Muslim atheist activist, author and podcaster, currently living in Vancouver, Canada
- Gilles Duceppe (1947–): politician, leader of the Opposition twice, 1996–1997; leader of the Bloc Québécois 1997–2011
- David Lewis (1909–1981): Canadian labour lawyer and social democratic politician
- Dale Jackaman (1956–): politician
- Sarah Polley (1979–): Canadian actress, writer, director, producer and political activist
- Pauline Marois (1949–): premier of Quebec 2012–2014, leader of Parti Québécois 2007–2014
- Françoise David (1948–): spokesperson and MNA for Quebec Solidaire
- Justin Trottier (1982–): political activist, former political candidate and founder of Canada's largest social-political movements for secularism and men's issues
- Norman Bethune (1890–1939): Canadian thoracic surgeon and member of the Communist Party of Canada.
- Nathan Phelps (1958–): American-born Canadian author, LGBT rights activist, and public speaker on the topics of religion and child abuse.
- Yasmine Mohammed, University instructor, human rights activist and author who is critical of Islam.

=== Costa Rica ===
- Ricardo Jiménez Oreamuno (1859–1945), three times President of Costa Rica.
- José Figueres Ferrer (1906–1990), three times President of Costa Rica.
- José Merino (1949–2012), left-wing activist and deputy.
- José María Villalta (1977–), deputy and presidential candidate.

=== Cuba ===
- Fidel Castro (1926–2016): first secretary of the Communist Party of Cuba, prime minister of Cuba, and president of Cuba, all 1959–2011
- Raúl Castro (1931–): first secretary of the Communist Party of Cuba 2011–2021

=== Mexico ===
- Carlos A. Madrazo (1915–1969): politician
- Narciso Bassols (1897–1959): politician
- Lázaro Cárdenas (1895–1970): 51st president of Mexico
- Venustiano Carranza (1859–1920): 44th president of Mexico
- Plutarco Elías Calles (1877–1945): 47th president of Mexico
- Tomás Garrido Canabal (1891–1943): politician
- Benito Juarez (1806–1872): 26th president of Mexico
- Alvaro Obregon (1880–1928): 46th Ppesident of Mexico

=== United States ===
- Rocky Anderson (1951–): 2012 Justice Party presidential candidate and former mayor of Salt Lake City, Utah
- Cecil Bothwell (1950–): Asheville, North Carolina city council member, who was nearly denied his position because of his atheism
- Lori Lipman Brown (1958–): politician, lobbyist, lawyer, educator, and social worker supporter, Nevada state senator 1992–1994
- Ernie Chambers (1937–): member of the Nebraska Legislature and civil rights activist
- Clarence Darrow (1857–1938): lawyer and leading member of the American Civil Liberties Union, best known for defending John T. Scopes in the so-called Monkey Trial
- Sean Faircloth (1960–): attorney, served five terms in the Maine Legislature, including appointments on the Judiciary and Appropriations Committees
- Barney Frank (1940–2026): U.S. representative (1981–2013) (D-MA)
- Thomas Gore (1870–1949): United States senator (D-OK) 1907–1921 and 1931–1937
- Vincent Hallinan (1896–1992): lawyer who ran for president of the United States in 1952 under the Progressive Party, the third highest-polling candidate in the election
- Jared Huffman (1964–): United States congressman (D-CA) since 2013; revealed in 2017 that he is a humanist and a non-believer; second openly non-religious member of Congress and the only one currently serving in House or Senate
- Heather Mac Donald (1956–): writer and lawyer, member of the Manhattan Institute and author of The Burden of Bad Ideas: How Modern Intellectuals Misshape Our Society
- Juan Mendez (1985–): state senator for Arizona
- Culbert Olson (1876–1962): politician, governor of California 1939–1943
- Pete Stark (1931–2020): U.S. representative (1973–2013) (D-CA), first openly atheist member of Congress
- Eddie Tabash: lawyer, atheist activist and debater
- Jesse Ventura (1951–): former governor of Minnesota, veteran, wrestler, actor, and talk show host
- George Will (1941–): newspaper columnist and political commentator
- Alan Wolfe (1951–): Political scientist and sociologist, director of the Boisi Center for Religion and American Public Life.
- Andrew Zwicker (1964–): member of the New Jersey General Assembly; scientist and educator, Princeton Plasma Physics Laboratory

== South America ==
=== Argentina ===
- Bernardo de Monteagudo (1789–1825): political activist and revolutionary; took part in the liberation struggles in South America, particularly in Argentina
- Lisandro de la Torre (1868 – 1939): National deputy and senator, a prominent polemicist, and founder of the Democratic Progressive Party in 1914. He ran twice for the office of President, in 1916 and in 1931.
- Carmen Argibay (1939–2014): Lawyer, member of the Argentine Supreme Court of Justice, the first woman to be nominated for the Court by a democratic government in Argentina.
- Che Guevara (1928–1967): Marxist revolutionary.

=== Guyana ===
- Janet Jagan (1920–2009): American-born socialist politician, prime minister and then president of Guyana

=== Paraguay ===
- José Gaspar Rodríguez de Francia (1766–1840): dictator of Paraguay 1814–1840

=== Uruguay ===
- José Mujica (1935–2025): politician and president of Uruguay 2010–2015
