= Allied Dunbar =

Former British life assurance group

- Industry: Insurance
- Founded: 1970
- Defunct: 1998; 28 years ago
- Fate: Acquired by BAT Industries
- Successor: Zurich Financial Services
- Headquarters: Swindon, UK
- Key people: Sir Mark Weinberg (Chairman)

Allied Dunbar was a large British life assurance group. In its early years it was known as Hambro Life Assurance and was listed on the London Stock Exchange and was once a constituent of the FTSE 100 Index. However, it was acquired by BAT Industries, merged with Eagle Star, and sold to Zurich Financial Services in 1998.

== History ==
The company was founded by Sir Mark Weinberg, Lord Joffe and Sir Sydney Lipworth after Abbey Life was taken over, with seed finance from Hambros Bank, and set up its headquarters in Swindon town centre in 1970 under the name Hambro Life Assurance. It was first listed on the London Stock Exchange in 1975. The company expanded its financial adviser operations during the late 1970s and early 1980s, acquiring the Allied Unit Trusts of which it was soon the major unitholder, to become 'Allied Hambro' in 1984. The company became 'Allied Dunbar' in 1985 after it purchased Dunbar & Co., a small private bank, following the acquisition by BAT Industries. The asset management department was hived off to form Threadneedle Investments, and it was bought out by Zurich Financial Services in 1998.

Its direct sales force became the 'Zurich Advice Network' (ZAN) in 2001. In 2005 and following changes in industry regulation ZAN evolved into a stand-alone entity known as Openwork—a directly authorised multi-tiered financial distribution network.

Allied Dunbar operated a large conference centre as King Edward's Place in Foxhill, near Swindon, which was sold to be a hotel following the closure of the direct sales operation.

== Endowment complaints ==
Over the period May 2001 to April 2003, a portion of the nearly 300,000 Allied Dunbar customers who had been sold endowment mortgages made complaints. These complaints were prompted by a fall in the market (which meant that nearly nine in ten of their accounts were likely to suffer maturity value and mortgage repayment shortfalls) as well as new regulations which required that customers be notified semi-annually of the projected earnings of the endowment, with particular regard to such shortfalls. Around 1,000 such complaints were rejected during the above period. The Financial Services Authority investigated the rejected complaints, as well as Allied Dunbar's internal procedures for handling such customer complaints, and while maintaining a majority of them, it fined the company £725,000 on 11 March 2004 for mishandling such complaints. In its decision, the Financial Services Authority noted that:

...complaint handlers had conducted poor-quality investigations and there was a failure to gather sufficient evidence to make a fair assessment of both the consumer's attitude to the risk and the suitability of the sale.

Allied Dunbar stopped writing endowment mortgages in November 2001. It was not the only company fined by the FSA, and at the time this was only the fifth-largest fine for offences related to endowment complaint mismanagement. Friends Provident had been fined £625,000 in November 2003, and five other firms had previously been fined a total of £5.2 million for their mismanagement of such complaints. The largest fine fell to Royal Scottish Assurance, which incurred a £2m penalty.

The hard-sell reputation of some of its salespeople helped give the company the industry nickname 'Allied Crowbar'.

== See also ==
- Kevin Ronaldson
