= Arthur Langton =

South African cricketer (1912–1942)

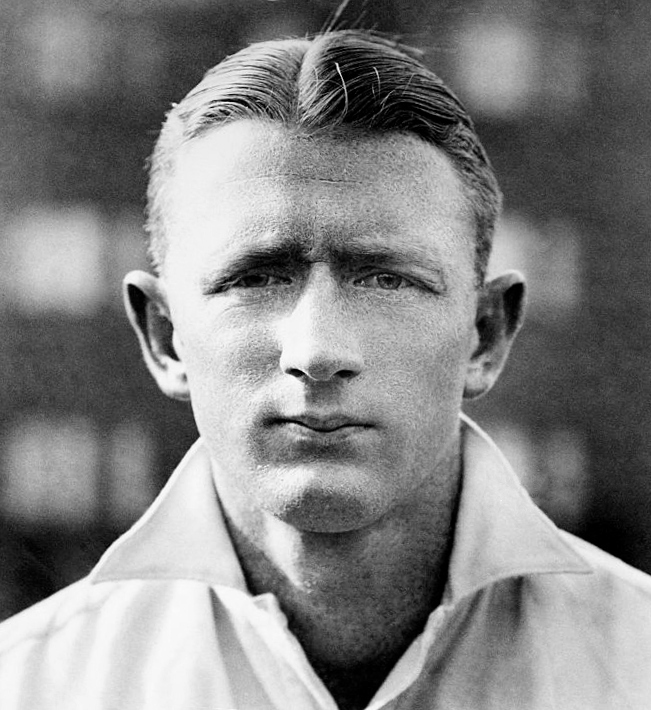
- Langton c. 1935

Personal information
- Full name: Arthur Chudleigh Beaumont Langton
- Born: 2 March 1912; Pietermaritzburg, Natal, South Africa
- Died: 27 November 1942 (aged 30); Maiduguri, Nigeria Protectorate
- Nickname: Chud
- Height: 6 ft 3 in (1.91 m)
- Batting: Right-handed
- Bowling: Right-arm fast-medium Right-arm medium

International information
- National side: South Africa

Career statistics
Competition	Tests	First-class
Matches	15	52
Runs scored	298	1218
Batting average	15.68	19.96
100s/50s	0/2	0/7
Top score	73*	73*
Balls bowled	4199	11317
Wickets	40	193
Bowling average	45.67	25.74
5 wickets in innings	1	9
10 wickets in match	0	2
Best bowling	5/58	6/53
Catches/stumpings	8/-	41/-
- Source: Cricinfo, 16 April 2018

Arthur Chudleigh Beaumont "Chud" Langton (2 March 1912 – 27 November 1942) was a South African cricketer who played in 15 Tests from 1935 to 1939. Jack Fingleton rated him amongst the best medium-paced bowlers he ever saw.

"Chud" was educated at King Edward VII School, Johannesburg. A tall, red-headed all-rounder, he came to prominence on the tour of England in 1935, when he made his Test debut. In the Second Test at Lord's he took 2 for 58 and 4 for 31 and made 44 batting at number eight in the second innings, valuable contributions to South Africa's first-ever Test victory in England, and subsequently to their 1–0 series victory. In the "Timeless Test" in Durban in 1938–39, he bowled 91 eight-ball overs, including 56 with a strapped back during the second innings, placing him fifth on the all-time list of most balls bowled in a Test: 728.

He died in Nigeria Protectorate at the age of 30 while serving as a flight lieutenant with the South African Air Force in World War II, when his Lockheed B34 Ventura bomber spun and crashed on landing.
