= St. James's Place plc =

British wealth management company

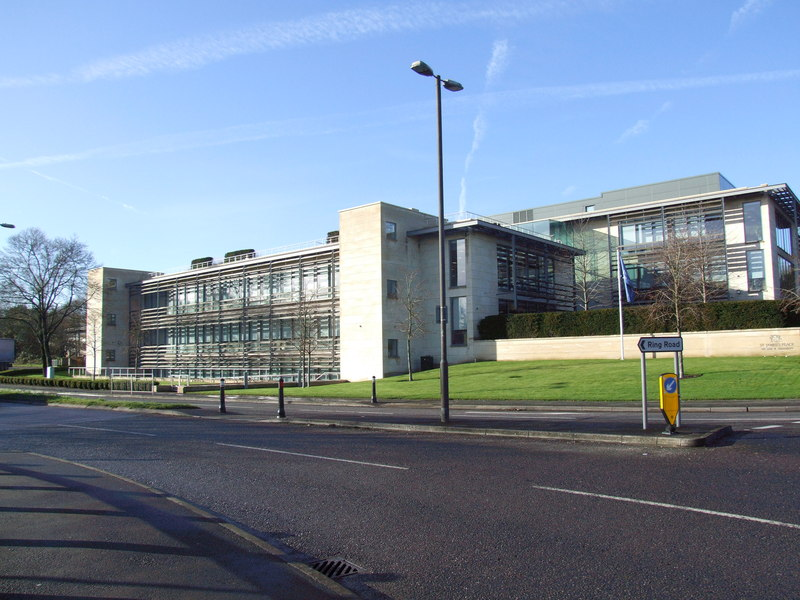
- St. James's Place offices, Tetbury Road, Cirencester
- Formerly: St. James's Place Capital plc; J. Rothschild Assurance
- Type: Public limited company
- Traded as: LSE: STJ; FTSE 100 component
- Industry: Wealth management
- Founded: 1991; 35 years ago
- Founders: Mike Wilson; Mark Weinberg; Jacob Rothschild
- Headquarters: Cirencester, England, UK
- Key people: Paul Manduca (chairperson); Mark FitzPatrick (CEO)
- Products: Wealth Management
- Revenue: ▲£3,766.4 million (2025)
- Operating income: ▲£1,335.2 million (2025)
- Net income: ▲£531.4 million (2025)
- AUM: ▲£240.8 billion (30 June 2026)
- Website: www.sjp.co.uk

St. James's Place plc, formerly St. James's Place Capital plc, is a British financial advice and wealth management company. The head office is in Cirencester, Gloucestershire, and there are sixteen other offices in the United Kingdom. It is a combined adviser, fund manager and life insurance business. It is listed on the London Stock Exchange and is a constituent of the FTSE 100 Index. As of June 2026, the company has £240.8 billion worth of assets under management (AUM).

== History ==
The business has its origins in an entity founded by Mark Weinberg and Mike Wilson in 1991. It secured the financial backing of Jacob Rothschild and became known as J. Rothschild Assurance.

In 1997, J. Rothschild Assurance merged with – and took on the name of – a much smaller entity, St. James's Place Capital.

The business was restructured and transferred to a new legal entity in 2000, when Halifax plc (formerly the Halifax Building Society) took a 60 per cent shareholding for £760 million.

In 2001 Halifax merged with the Bank of Scotland to form HBOS, which in 2009 was bought by the Lloyds Banking Group, which thus acquired a majority holding in St. James's Place Capital. In March 2013 Lloyds sold 20% of its holding to institutional investors, and in December that year sold its remaining holding by private placement for £670m.

In 2014 the company bought Henley Group, a financial adviser with offices in Hong Kong, Singapore and Shanghai, and renamed it St. James's Place Asia. It bought Rowan Dartington, a discretionary fund manager, for £34.2m in 2015, and Technical Connection, a financial consultancy, in 2016.

In January 2018, Andrew Croft replaced David Bellamy as chief executive, after thirteen years as chief financial officer.

Paul Manduca replaced Iain Cornish as chairman of the firm after the annual general meeting in May 2021.

In May 2023, SJP opened an office in Dubai's International Financial Centre after receiving approval from the Dubai Financial Services Authority.

In September 2023, the company announced that Andrew Croft would be stepping down as CEO after five years in the role. It was also announced that Mark FitzPatrick would be his replacement with effect from 1 December 2023.

In July 2024, SJP announced a company restructure to save £100 million from the business by 2027. As part of the restructure, the company announced plans to reduce its headcount by 580 jobs in December 2024.

In November 2025, it was announced SJP had sold a multi-asset real estate portfolio located around the South East of England and London to the Dallas-headquartered global private equity company, Lone Star Funds for an undisclosed amount. The portfolio comprised 16 assets, including multi-let industrial, retail and office properties.

== Controversies ==
In July 2017 an investigation by Which? accused St James's Place of misleading customers on charges. Tom Wilson, author of the article, writes, "There are legitimate reasons why costs might vary – SJP's recommended funds have different charges, so the actual fees will depend on which funds you end up with." The findings of the investigation were sent to the Financial Conduct Authority. The firm continues to have permission to provide regulated products and services.

In July 2019, the Financial Ombudsman Service raised "serious concerns", after a client had been persuaded to transfer more than £60,000 to the company, over claims that St. James's Place had "doctored" documents with "forged" signatures to hide the advice allegedly given by the company to the client.

In November 2019 fourteen former footballers sued St James's Place for £15m, alleging that they had received poor advice concerning tax avoidance regarding film and overseas property investment schemes. A spokesman for St James's Place said the partner was not authorised to direct investors to the plan, and that the proposal was not approved by St James's. The St James's Place spokesman also said the partner had retired when many of the investments were made, and that other investments were placed through a self-invested personal pension (SIPP) by a third party. The spokesman also said the statute of limitations on the claims had expired because the investments had been made more than 10 years before.

In February 2024, the company admitted that it had been accused of "overcharging thousands of clients" and making customers pay "for ongoing advice they did not receive". The chief executive, Mark FitzPatrick, apologised and agreed to set aside £426 million to refund the clients who had been overcharged. In January 2025, in a test case, the financial ombudsman ordered the company to pay compensation. In February 2025, The Times reported that some clients had been waiting for years for compensation that had been promised by the company but had not been received.
