= Stuart Hiddleston =

South African cricketer

Personal information
- Full name: Douglas Stuart Hiddleston
- Born: 2 March 1910; Johannesburg, Transvaal, South Africa
- Died: 13 February 1984 (aged 73); Durban, Natal, South Africa
- Batting: Right-handed
- Bowling: Leg break googly

Domestic team information
- Years: Team
- 1930–1934: Scotland

Career statistics
| Competition | First-class |
|---|---|
| Matches | 5 |
| Runs scored | 65 |
| Batting average | 9.28 |
| 100s/50s | –/– |
| Top score | 15 |
| Balls bowled | 708 |
| Wickets | 27 |
| Bowling average | 15.33 |
| 5 wickets in innings | 2 |
| 10 wickets in match | – |
| Best bowling | 7/69 |
| Catches/stumpings | –/– |
- Source: Cricinfo, 28 October 2022

Douglas Stuart Hiddleston (2 March 1910 — 13 February 1984) was a South African first-class cricketer and physician.

Hiddleston was born at Johannesburg in March 1910, where he was educated at King Edward VII School, before matriculating to the University of Edinburgh in Scotland, where he studied medicine. While studying in Scotland, he played club cricket for Selkirk and was selected to play for the Scottish cricket team in a first-class match against Ireland at Aberdeen in 1930. He played first-class cricket for Scotland until 1934, making five appearances. Playing as a leg break googly bowler, he took 27 wickets at an average of 15.33; he took two five wicket hauls with best figures of 7 for 69. As a lower order batsman he scored 65 runs, with a highest score of 15.

Hiddleston qualified from the University of Edinburgh in 1935. He returned to South Africa, where he was a general practitioner in Durban for nearly fifty years. He was employed by Mobil South Africa as a medical officer. Hiddleston died at Durban in February 1984, having had a serious physical disability for a number of years. He was survived by his wife, Allison, and three children.
