= King Edward VII School, Johannesburg =

All-boys public school in South Africa

Coordinates: 26°10′24″S 28°03′46″E

King Edward VII School
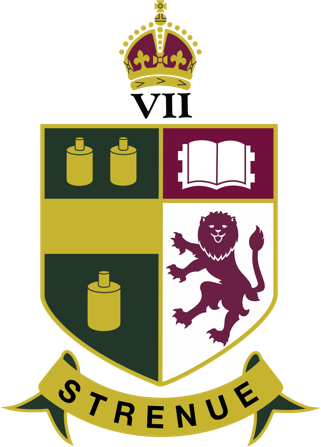
- King Edward VII School crest

Location
- 44 St. Patrick Road, Houghton Estate; Johannesburg, Gauteng 2198; South Africa

Information
- School type: All-boys public school
- Motto: Strenue (Carry on)
- Religious affiliation: Christianity
- Established: 1902; 124 years ago
- School number: +27 (011) 551 5800
- Headmaster: David Lovatt
- Grades: 8–12
- Gender: Male
- Age: 14 to 18
- Enrollment: 1,200 boys
- Language: English
- Schedule: 07:30 - 14:10 (07:30-13:15 on Wednesdays)
- Campus: Urban Campus
- Campus type: Suburban
- Houses: Anderson; Crofts; Davis; Grimmer; Hill; Hofmeyr; Robinson; School
- Colours: Red; Green; White
- Rivals: Afrikaanse Hoër Seunskool; Jeppe High School for Boys; Parktown Boys' High School; Pretoria Boys High School; St John's College, Johannesburg; Westville Boys' High School
- Accreditation: Gauteng Department of Education
- Alumni: Old Edwardians
- Fees: High School; R68 000 p.a. (tuition); R63 500 p.a. (weekly boarding); R75 000 p.a. (termly boarding)
- Website: www.kes.co.za

King Edward VII School (KES) is a public English medium high school for boys situated within the city of Johannesburg in South Africa's Gauteng Province, one of the historically significant Milner Schools.

The school is a public school, with an enrollment of over 1,100 boys from grades 8 to 12 (ages 13 to 18). King Edward VII Preparatory School (KEPS), which is situated adjacent to the High School and shares its grounds, caters to boys from grades R to 7.

== History ==
In 1902, when the Boer War came to an end, there was an urgent need for schools in the Transvaal. The Milner Administration, in search of suitable buildings in which to establish temporary classrooms, found a vacant cigar factory in Johannesburg, on the corner of Gold and Kerk Streets, which was chosen as venue for "The Government High School for Boys", also known as the "Johannesburg High School for Boys". Thus was born a school which ultimately became the King Edward VII School.

It grew so rapidly that, in 1904, it was moved to Barnato Park where it was established in the mansion that originally had been designed for the mining millionaire Barney Barnato, who died at sea in 1897. At its new location, it was referenced as "Johannesburg College" but, within seven years, the premises were deemed inadequate and, in 1911, the school was moved to its present site on the Houghton ridge where new buildings had been impressively-designed and specifically constructed for the school. The time frame, within less than a year after the founding of the Union of South Africa and the death of Queen Victoria's eldest son and successor, Edward VII, led to the proposal that the institution's name be changed to honour his memory, thus establishing the appellation, King Edward VII School.

== Buildings ==
Over a century old, the school buildings of King Edward retain their impressive appearance and are considered national monuments. These include the school hall, the back façade, the front façade, the lecture theatre and library wing, the memorial wing and the cenotaph in the main quad.

== Sports and culture ==
Sports that are offered in the school are:

- Athletics
- Basketball
- Chess
- Cricket
- Cross country
- Golf
- Hockey
- Rowing
- Rugby
- Soccer
- Squash
- Swimming
- Table tennis
- Tennis
- Water polo

Cultural activities that are offered:

- English Public Speaking
- Afrikaans Public Speaking
- Debating
- Model UN
- Music Society
- Choral Society
- Pipe Band
- Marimba

== Notable Old Edwardians ==
- Sydney Kentridge, lawyer and judge
- Sydney Lipworth, lawyer and businessman
- Mark Weinberg
- Donald Gordon, businessman and philanthropist
- Johann Kriegler
- Richard Goldstone, Constitutional Court judge
- Ronnie Kasrils, cabinet minister
- William Kentridge, artist
- Bryce Courtenay, novelist ("The Power of One")
- Michael McClelland, Professor of Microbiology and Genetics at the University of California, Irvine
- Antony Preston, Naval Historian
- Arthur Walker HCG, Bar, SAAF Pilot

=== Sportsmen ===
- Buster Nupen, cricketer
- Gary Player, golf
- Chud Langton, cricketer
- Ali Bacher, cricketer
- Kevin McKenzie, cricketer
- Neil McKenzie, cricketer
- Ray Jennings, cricketer
- Hugh Page, cricketer
- Adam Bacher, cricketer
- Nic Pothas, cricketer
- Graeme Smith, cricketer
- Ryan Watson (cricketer)
- Joe van Niekerk, rugby player
- Bryan Habana, rugby player
- Rhys M. Thomas, rugby player (Wales)
- Cliff Durandt, soccer player
- Vaughn van Jaarsveld, cricketer
- Scarra Ntubeni, rugby player
- Thabo Nodada, football/soccer player
- Quinton de Kock, cricketer
- Darryn Anthony, Olympic Weight LifterOlympic Games
- Stephen Cook (cricketer)
- Malcolm Marx, Springbok rugby player
- Keaton Jennings, cricketer (England)
- Stan Schmidt, karate
- John Gartly, cricketer
- Stuart Hiddleston, cricketer
- Tony de Zorzi, cricketer
- David Teeger, cricketer
- Lythe Pillay, athlete
