= John Gartly =

South African cricketer and South African Army officer

Personal information
- Full name: John Devitt Elrick Gartly
- Born: 8 January 1908; Johannesburg, Transvaal, South Africa
- Died: 22 November 1941 (aged 33); Sidi Rezegh, Italian Libya
- Batting: Unknown
- Role: Wicket-keeper

Domestic team information
- Years: Team
- 1931/32–1932/33: Transvaal

Career statistics
| Competition | First-class |
|---|---|
| Matches | 3 |
| Runs scored | 38 |
| Batting average | 9.50 |
| 100s/50s | –/– |
| Top score | 10 |
| Catches/stumpings | 2/1 |
- Source: Cricinfo, 10 June 2022

John Devitt Elrick Gartly (8 January 1908 – 22 November 1941) was a South African first-class cricketer and South African Army officer.

The son of William and Elizabeth Gartly, he was born at Johannesburg in January 1908 and was subsequently educated in the city at King Edward VII School. Gartly made three appearances in first-class cricket as a wicket-keeper for Transvaal in 1932, playing twice against Western Province and once against Natal. He scored 38 runs in his three matches, with a highest score of 10; as a wicket-keeper, he took two catches and made a single stumping.

Gartly served in the South African Army during the Second World War as an officer in the 3rd Battalion, Transvaal Scottish Regiment. He served with the regiment in the East African campaign, seeing action in Italian Ethiopia during the Battle of Mega in February 1941, which resulted in the South Africans capturing the town from Italian forces. From there, the regiment proceeded to Egypt to take part in Operation Crusader, during which Gartly died from wounds at Sidi Rezegh on 22 November 1941. At the time of his death he held the rank of major. Gartly was buried at the Knightsbridge War Cemetery in Libya. His brother was also killed during the war in April 1945.
