= Kevin Ronaldson =

British businessman (born 1958)

Kevin Hugh Ronaldson (born March 1958) is the Chief Executive Officer of Bellpenny, a financial services firm that specialises in consolidating the investment funds under management of other financial services firms where the principals are retiring or otherwise wish to exit the financial services industry.

Ronaldson began his career in financial services at Allied Dunbar after graduating from Oxford University in 1979. He became one of the company's top salesmen ever before selling his business back to the firm in 1997 to join the Board of Allied Dunbar as Product and Marketing Director. Later, he became Chairman of Zurich Independent. In 2005, Ronaldson left Zurich to start Intrinsic Financial Services where he was Chief Executive for 3 years and Deputy Chairman from 2009. He joined Bellpenny in 2012.
