= Joel Joffe, Baron Joffe =

British lawyer (1932–2017)

The Right Honourable The Lord Joffe CBE

Member of the House of Lords
- Lord Temporal
- Life peerage 16 February 2000 – 30 March 2015

Personal details
- Born: Joel Goodman Joffe; 12 May 1932 Johannesburg, Transvaal, South Africa
- Died: 18 June 2017 (aged 85) Liddington, Wiltshire, England, UK
- Party: Labour (2007 onwards)
- Other political affiliations: None (crossbencher; 2000–2007)
- Spouse: Vanetta Pretorius
- Children: 3
- Education: University of Witwatersrand
- Occupation: Human rights lawyer

Joel Goodman Joffe, Baron Joffe, CBE (12 May 1932 – 18 June 2017) was a South African-born British lawyer and Labour peer in the House of Lords.

== Early life and education ==
Born in Johannesburg, South Africa, to the Joffe family. His mother was born in Mandatory Palestine and his father was born in Lithuania, Joffe grew up in a Jewish household before being sent to a Catholic boarding school. He was educated at the University of Witwatersrand (BCom, LLB 1955).

== Career ==
He worked as a human rights lawyer 1958–65, including as defence attorney of the leadership of the ANC at the 1963-4 Rivonia Trial, helping to represent Nelson Mandela and his co-defendants.

He married the artist Vanetta Pretorius in 1962 and moved with her to the United Kingdom in 1965 after being refused entry to Australia as he was considered "undesirable". Once in the UK he worked in the financial services industry, setting up Hambro Life Assurance with Sir Mark Weinberg, as well as in the voluntary sector.

Joffe chaired the Swindon and Marlborough Health Authority and the Ridgeway Hospital and was a member of The Royal Commission on the Care of the Elderly. He was associated with Oxfam in various roles between 1982 and 2001, including being its Chair 1995–2001. He was a trustee of many different charities and actively pursued a range of charitable activities through the Joffe Charitable Trust which he set up with his wife Vanetta in 1968.

He appeared on the BBC radio programme Desert Island Discs on 28 October 2007.

In 2017 Joffe appeared along with surviving defendants at the Rivonia Trial, Denis Goldberg, Andrew Mlangeni and Ahmed Kathrada, along with fellow defence lawyers George Bizos and Denis Kuny, in a documentary film entitled Life is Wonderful, directed by Sir Nicholas Stadlen, which tells the story of the trial. The title reflects Goldberg's words to his mother at the end of the trial on hearing that he and his comrades had been spared the death sentence.

=== House of Lords ===
He made a life peer on 16 February 2000, being raised to the peerage as Baron Joffe, of Liddington in the County of Wiltshire. Originally a crossbencher, he sat as a Labour Party peer from 18 July 2007.

In February 2003 he proposed as a Private Member's Bill the "Assisted Dying for the Terminally Ill Bill", which would legalise physician-assisted dying. After deliberation by a Lords committee, the bill was put forward again in November 2005. On 12 May 2006, the Bill was debated once again in the House of Lords and an amendment to delay its introduction by six months was carried by a margin of 148–100, halting progress of the bill in that session.

Joffe retired from the House of Lords on 30 March 2015.

== Honours ==
He was awarded Honorary Doctorates from the Open University (1995), De Montfort University (2000), University of the Witwatersrand (2001), Brunel University (2004) and the University of Bath (2006). In 2016, he was awarded the Freedom of the City of London.

He was appointed Commander of the Order of the British Empire (CBE) in the 1999 New Year Honours.

== Personal life ==
Joel married Vanetta Joffe (nee Pretorius) in 1962, and they had three daughters. A Jewish atheist and a humanist in his beliefs, Joel was a devoted member and patron of Humanists UK, which campaigns on ethical issues like assisted dying and for a secular state in the UK.

Joffe died on 18 June 2017 at his home in Liddington after a short illness at the age of 85. His life was celebrated in many tributes and obituaries. Vanetta died on 6 November 2023.

== Publications ==
- Joel Joffe, The Rivonia Story, Mayibuye Books, Cape Town, 1995
- Joel Joffe, The State Vs. Nelson Mandela: The Trial That Changed South Africa, Oneworld Publications, 2007
