= Abbey Life =

Abbey Life Assurance Company Limited
- Type: Limited company
- Industry: Life assurance
- Founded: 1961
- Headquarters: Bournemouth, UK
- Key people: David Woollett, Director
- Owner: Phoenix Group
- Website: www.abbeylife.co.uk

Abbey Life Assurance Company Limited is a life assurance business based in London also with an office in Bournemouth. The company has been closed to new business since 2000. Abbey Life was formerly a public company listed on the London Stock Exchange and was once a constituent of the FTSE 100 Index.

== History ==
The company was founded by Mark Weinberg in 1961 as the Abbey Life Assurance Company. ITT Corporation bought a half interest in the Company in 1964 and in 1970 bought the rest. It was first listed on the London Stock Exchange in 1986. In 1988, the then Lloyds Bank acquired a majority stake in the business which became known as Lloyds Abbey Life. The Company became wholly owned by Lloyds TSB in 1996 and absorbed Hill Samuel Life Assurance Company in 1998. It lost its sales force in 2000 when it closed to new business.

In 2007, Lloyds Banking Group sold the company to Deutsche Bank.

On 30 December 2016 Abbey Life was acquired by the Phoenix Group.
