= Gaudenz Canova =

Swiss socialist, politician and lawyer

Gaudenz Canova (31 December 1887, Domat/Ems – 21 January 1962, Chur) was a Swiss socialist from Graubünden (Grisons).

A lawyer and Social Democratic politician, Canova was a member of the National Council from his native canton in 1922–1925 and 1928–1935. He continued to be elected to political offices in Graubünden into the 1940s.

His political career is notable for his 1925 conviction for blasphemy and his participation in the Swiss left's struggle against fascism and pro-Nazi sentiment in the 1930s. Canova's 1940 condemnation of fascism in an opening speech before the Grand Council of Graubünden remained unpublished as a result of censorship until long after his death.

== Biography ==
The son of farmer Jakob Daniel Canova and his wife Maria Elisabeth (née Jörg), Gaudenz Canova was born on December 31, 1887, in the municipality Domat/Ems. At first educated at Swiss schools, he proceeded to study law in Berlin and Freiburg im Brisgau and was awarded the title of doctor of jurisprudence by the University of Freiburg.

Canova became involved in Graubünden's social democratic politics as a lawyer in Chur. He was elected to his first term in the National Council of Switzerland in 1922, and was a part-time editor of Graubünden's Bündner Volkswacht during the 1920s.

A proponent of secularist ideas, Canova was legally tried and convicted of blasphemy in 1925 for material published in the Volkswacht following a lawsuit begun on behalf of a Swiss Catholic association, and his career in the assembly came to a temporary halt after the controversy.

A brief note on the episode in a March 1925 issue Time magazine reported that

M. Canova, Socialist member of the National Council, wrote in his newspaper Volkswacht that God is a scoundrel. For that, a court of justice fined him 200 francs. In his defense, M. Canova said that, as there was no God, he could not be guilty of blasphemy against Him."

Reelected to the National Council in 1928-1935, Canova was one of the antagonists of the Swiss Nazi leader Wilhelm Gustloff in the 1930s, and acquired a reputation as a relentless opponent of the Nazis' sympathizers on the Swiss far right.

Canova continued to hold political offices in Graubünden long after his second term with the National Council. During the Second World War, Canova delivered a notable anti-fascist speech as Graubünden Standespräsident in November 1940. Its content was officially censored, and the address remained unpublished until 1980.

Canova died on January 21, 1962, in Chur, Graubünden.
