= Mark Weinberg =

South African-born British financier (born 1931)

Sir Mark Weinberg
- Born: Mark Aubrey Weinberg; 9 August 1931 (age 95); Union of South Africa
- Education: King Edward VII School, Johannesburg
- Alma mater: London School of Economics
- Occupation: Financier
- Known for: Founder, Abbey Life and Allied Dunbar
- Title: President, St. James's Place plc
- Spouse: Anouska Hempel (m. 1980)
- Children: 4

Sir Mark Aubrey Weinberg (born 9 August 1931) is a South African-born British financier. He is known for founding several financial companies including the Abbey Life Assurance Company, Allied Dunbar and St. James's Place plc.

== Early life and education ==
Weinberg was born in South Africa and educated at King Edward VII School in Johannesburg. He received degrees in commerce and law from University of Witwatersrand, Johannesburg, South Africa and practised as a barrister. He later received his Master of Laws at the London School of Economics, specialising in company law, and wrote the book Takeovers and Mergers whilst there.

== Financial services career ==
In 1961, he founded Abbey Life Assurance Company in London, which was one of the first companies to develop unit-linked assurance and where he formed one of the UK's first retail property funds.

In 1971, he went on to found Hambro Life Assurance, subsequently called Allied Dunbar, where he was managing director until 1983 (it is now part of Zurich Financial Services), and grew the corporation to become the largest unit-linked life assurance company in the UK, operating in the insurance broker market as well as building up a sales force. There he formed the first retail managed fund and originated the concept of the variable premium whole life policy.

He was knighted in the 1987 New Year's Honours List.

With the late Mike Wilson and Jacob Rothschild, he co-founded J. Rothschild Assurance, which became St. James's Place Wealth Management and later joined the FTSE 100.

In 2006, he became the executive chairman of Synergy Insurance Services, an innovative corporate insurance company. Additionally, from its founding in 2005 until 2016, he was the chairman of the Pension Insurance Corporation, a company set up to provide insurance solutions for pension scheme management, in particular for defined benefit corporate pension schemes.

Weinberg was a non-executive director of GuestInvest, which owned Blakes Hotel, a hotel established by his wife.

== Other activities ==
He was deputy chairman of the Securities and Investment Board, the principal UK regulatory body, from its inception in 1985 until 1990, having been an adviser on insurance affairs to the Secretary of State for Trade and Industry.

He is also the author of Weinberg and Blank on Take-overs and Mergers (1962), the standard legal textbook on the subject, now in its fifth edition (1989), which he wrote with Victor Blank.

He was the co-founder of the Per Cent Club, a grouping of top companies committed to increasing companies’ charitable and community contributions, and deputy chairman of Business in the Community.

From 1983 to 1991, he was the honorary treasurer of the National Society for the Prevention of Cruelty to Children and from 1985 to 1992 was a trustee of the Tate Gallery.

He is an honorary bencher of Gray's Inn and is a governor emeritus of the London School of Economics.

In 2013, he underwrote the development of CAERvest, a human cooling device that is used to treat heatstroke.

== Family ==
He is married to former actress, hotelier and designer Anouska Hempel, his second wife, and has 4 children. He lives at Cole Park near Malmesbury in Wiltshire.
