= Waterfront Trail =

Pedestrian and bicycle trail system in Ontario, Canada

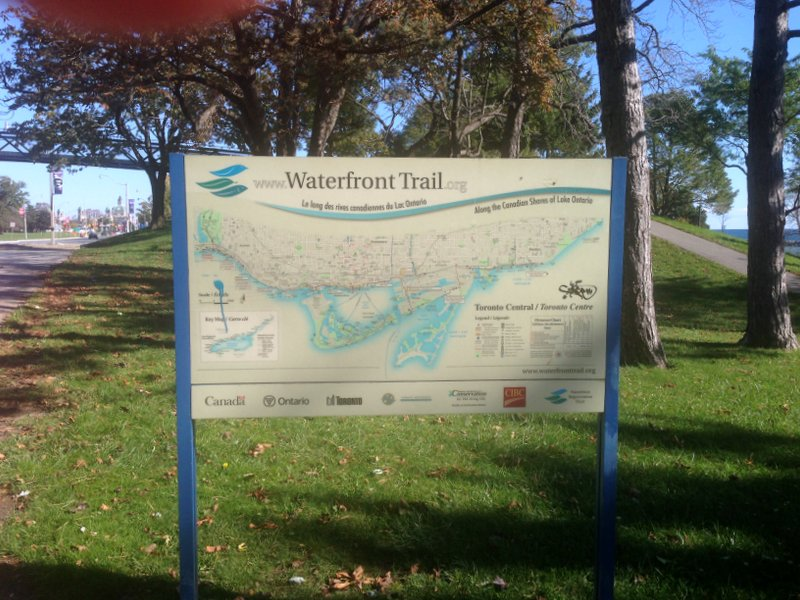
- A sign demarcating The Waterfront Trail in Toronto
- Length: 3,600 km (2,200 mi)
- Location: Ontario, Canada
- Trailheads: Niagara-on-the-Lake, Quebec border (near Cornwall, Ontario)
- Use: Biking, hiking, inline skating

Logo of The Waterfront Trail

The Great Lakes Waterfront Trail is a 3,600 km (2,200 mi) signed route of roads and trails in Ontario, Canada, running between Sault Ste. Marie and the Quebec border following the Great Lakes and St. Lawrence River. The trail connects over 150 communities and First Nations. It is a legacy project of the Waterfront Regeneration Trust, and its community partners. Through Toronto, the trail is called the Martin Goodman Trail. The Waterfront Trail is also used by commuters in parts of Southern Ontario.

== Expansion and future plans ==
In October 2013, Premier of Ontario Kathleen Wynne announced government support for expansion of the trail system to better connect the 2015 Pan Am Games venues and community.

I want to ensure that all of the people of this province benefit from our investments in the Pan Am and Parapan Am Games, because that is how we can grow as One Ontario. Extending our trails system and connecting more communities is a great way for the excitement of the Games to live on well beyond 2015.

— Kathleen Wynne, Premier of Ontario, October 3, 2013

The announcement ensures that "the province will work with First Nation and Métis communities and organizations to incorporate Aboriginal markers along the trails to honour the history and culture of Aboriginal communities in Ontario."

Trails will connect to four major Pan Am and Parapan Am Games venues – CIBC Pan Am/Parapan Am Athletes' Village, CIBC Pan Am Park, CIBC Hamilton Soccer Stadium and Pan Am/Parapan Am Fields.

All consultations related to Pan Am/Parapan Am trails will address accessibility requirements under the Accessibility for Ontarians with Disabilities Act.

In November 2013, two waterfront-design firms were selected to reimagine the space at the former Ontario Place grounds in Toronto to incorporate a broader mandate for greenspace and parkland.

Since 2013, the Trail has been growing radically, with expansions along the shores of Lake Erie, Lake Huron, Georgian Bay and Lake Huron's north channel, adding over 2000 km to its length.

== Uses ==
The rising cost of automobiles and gasoline mean a heavier burden on the trail system from multiple uses.

- Walking/Hiking
- Running
- Cycling
- Inline skating
- Skateboarding
- Mobility scooters
- Mountain biking

Controversial decisions to limit some e-bike and mobility scooters have been underway along portions of the trail.

== Cities ==
Municipalities and First Nations connected by the Great Lakes Waterfront Trail
St. Lawrence River	Lake Ontario	Lake Erie & Lake St. Clair	Lake Huron	Georgian Bay	Lake Huron (North Channel)
South Glengarry	Loyalist	Niagara-on-the-Lake	Plympton-Wyoming	Northern Bruce Peninsula (Tobermory, Lion's Head)	Greater Sudbury
Cornwall	Greater Napanee	Niagara Falls	Kettle & Stoney Point First Nation	South Bruce Peninsula (Wiarton)	Nairn and Hyman
South Dundas	Deseronto	Fort Erie	Lambton Shores (Grand Bend)	Georgian Bluffs	Baldwin
South Stormont	Belleville	Port Colborne	South Huron	Owen Sound	Espanola
Prescott	Quinte West	Haldimand County (Dunnville, Nanticoke)	Bluewater (GAP)	Meaford	NEMI (Little Current)
Augusta	Prince Edward County (Picton, Carrying Place)	Norfolk County (Port Dover, Long Point)	Central Huron	The Blue Mountains (Thornbury, Blue Mountain Village)	Sheguiandah
Brockville	Brighton	Elgin County (Port Burwell, Port Stanley)	Goderich	Collingwood	Assiginack (Manitouwaning)
Gananoque	Cramahe / Colborne	Chatham-Kent South (Erieau, Rondeau Park)	Ashfield-Colborne-Wawanosh (Amberley)	Wasaga Beach	Sables-Spanish Rivers
Frontenac Islands (Wolfe Island and Howe Island)	Alnwick/Haldimand	Leamington	Huron-Kinloss (Lucknow, Ripley)	Township of Tiny	Spanish
Kingston	Cobourg	Kingsville	Kincardine	Penetanguishene	Serpent River First Nation
	Port Hope	Pelee Island	Saugeen Shores (Port Elgin, Southampton)	Midland	Township of the North Shore
	Clarington	Colchester	Saugeen Ojibway Nation	Tay Township (Waubaushene)	Blind River
	Oshawa	Amherstburg	South Bruce Peninsula (Sauble Beach)	Severn Township (Port Severn, Severn Bridge)	Huron Shores (Iron Bridge)
	Whitby	LaSalle	Northern Bruce Peninsula (Tobermory)	Orillia	Thessalon
	Ajax	Windsor	Manitoulin Island	Gravenhurst	Plummer Additional
	Pickering	Tecumseh	Tekummah (South Baymouth)	Bracebridge	Bruce Mines
	Toronto	Lakeshore		Muskoka Lakes (Port Carling, Bala, Minette)	Johnson Township (Desbarats)
	Mississauga	Chatham-Kent North (Pain Court, Mitchell's Bay)		Georgian Bay (Honey Harbour, MacTier)	St. Joseph Island (Richard's Landing, Jocelyn, Hilton, Hilton Beach)
	Oakville	Wallaceburg		Seguin (Rosseau)	Tarbutt Township
	Burlington	St. Clair (Sombra)		Parry Sound	Laird Township
	Hamilton	Sarnia and Point Edward		McDougall	McDonald, Meredith and Aberdeen Additional (Echo Bay)
	Grimsby			Carling	Garden River First Nation
	Lincoln			The Archipelago	Sault Ste Marie
	St. Catharines (Port Dalhousie, Port Weller)			Shawanaga First Nation	Prince Township

Regional Municipalities connected by the Great Lakes Waterfront Trail

- Frontenac County
- Northumberland County
- Regional Municipality of Durham
- Region Of Peel
- Niagara Region
- Essex County
- Lambton County
- Huron County
- Bruce County
- Grey County
- Simcoe County
- Muskoka District

== Notable waypoints ==
The rise of social travel and photography have paralleled with the rise of smaller wearable technological advancements that permits travelers along the trail a variety of activities and destinations.

=== Toronto Harbourfront ===
Location: 43°36′55.12″N 79°23′28.21″W

The jewel of the Waterfront Trail lies at the Toronto Islands Ferry Terminal where trail users can catch a ferry to the expansive Toronto Islands including Centre Island and Hanlon's Point Beach. In 2015, the Waterfront Trail is expected to connect to the huge underground Toronto PATH system. Cyclists and skaters are encouraged on the peaceful island where only utility vehicles are permitted.

Among the artistic touches of this portion of the trail include the architecturally renowned Wave Decks, designed by West8.

=== The Beaches ===
Location: 43°39′20.12″N 79°18′40.21″W

The Beaches community in eastern Toronto is an important location on the trail, being one of the only neighbourhoods in Toronto with residential homes next to the lakeshore. The Beach itself is a popular destination, hosting games of beach volleyball, and attracting many cyclists and rollerbladers. North of the waterfront are many small stores and restaurants along Queen Street and The Danforth. From the Beaches, the trail, called the Martin Goodman Trail, runs west along the Toronto waterfront for its entire length, with only a few sections on city streets. Currently, there isn't any path running east along the waterfront from the Beaches.

=== Sugar Beach ===
Sugar Beach is a former parking lot located at Lower Jarvis Street and Queen's Quay—the park is now a non-swimming beach on the south-eastern edge of South Core, Toronto.

=== Port Credit ===
Location: 43°33′02″N 79°35′10″W

Port Credit straddles the Credit River with a mix of residential and commercial development along the trail. Most of the trail is separated from traffic with the exception of some residential streets at the east end near the Adamson Estate.

=== Spencer Smith Park ===
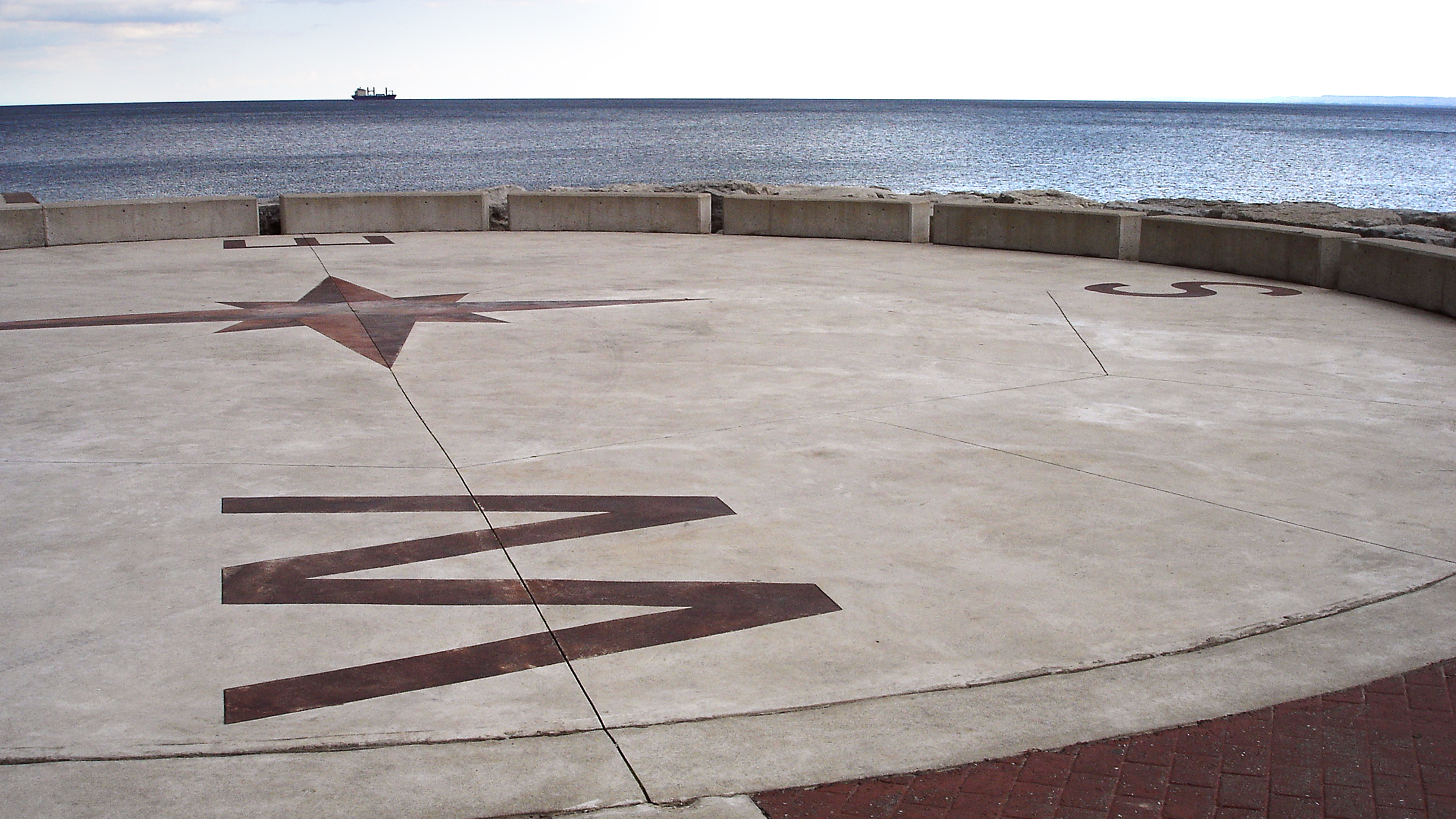
Spencer Smith Park's Waterfront Trail "compass"

Location: 44°5′33″N 79°31′7″W

Spencer Smith Park at Burlington is a prime example of the evolution of mixed-use development and city planning in the Greater Toronto Area. In 2013, the Brant Street Pier was opened by the City of Burlington that anchors the trail along the shores of the lake.

Spencer Smith Park hosts the annual Sound of Music Festival, a longtime tradition and celebration for Halton and surrounding areas.

=== 1000 Islands ===
Location: 44°20′19″N 76°8′1″W

The 1000 Islands bike path is a 37 kilometre trail running parallel to the Parkway between Gananoque and Brockville, forming a section of the Waterfront Trail.

=== Ontario Place ===
In July 2014, the provincial government of Ontario announced a $100 million renovation plan that will see the transformation of Ontario Place from an entertainment venue into a huge mixed-use park that will anchor the trail in this section.

== Cycling on the trail ==
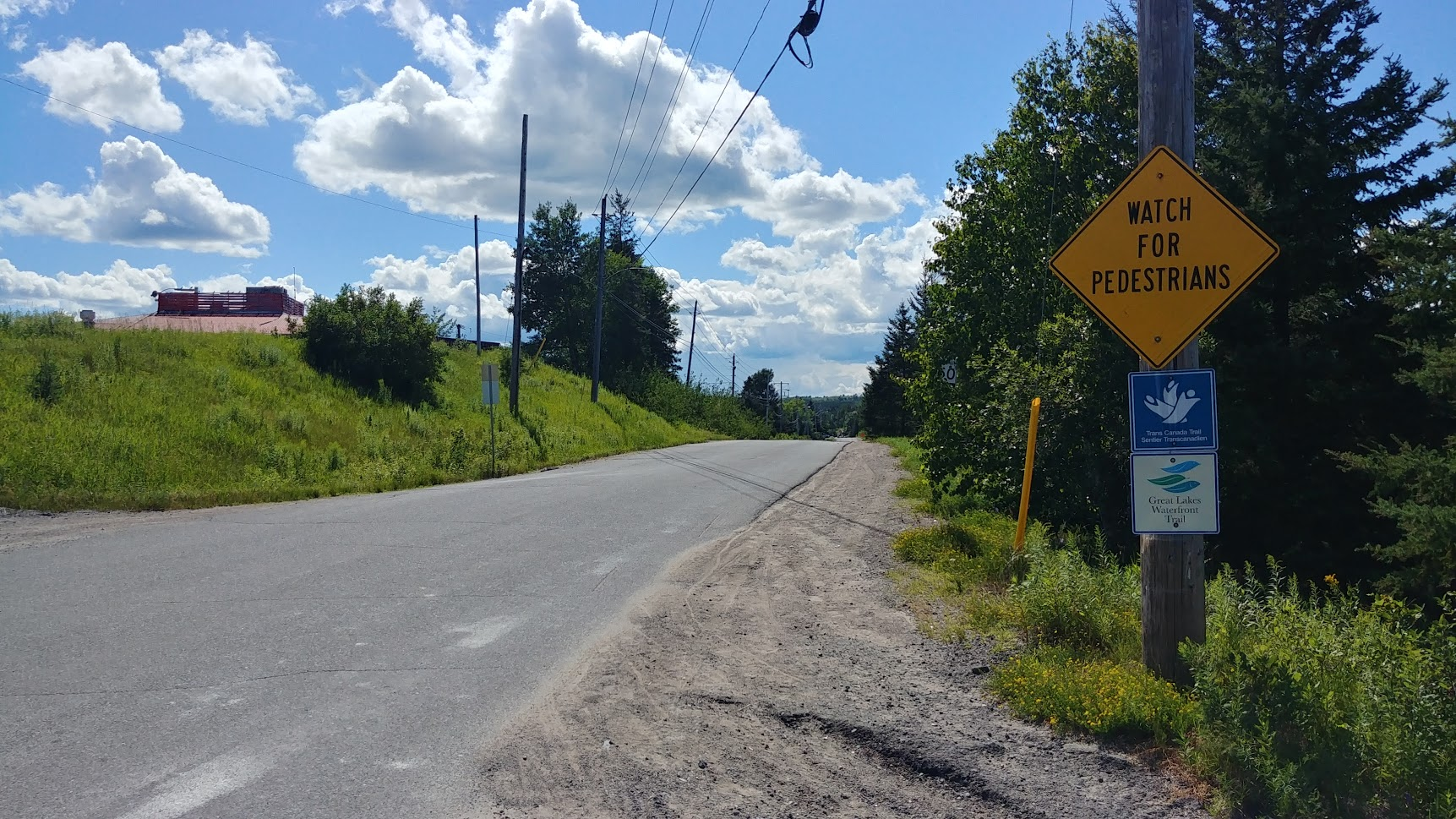
Old Soo Road in Lively, one of a number of mixed-traffic sections of the trail.

Not all sections of the Great Lakes Waterfront Trail are off-road. The route is designated with existing infrastructure in place with the goal of future improvements, including a legacy goal of a completely off-road trail, as close to the water's edge as ecologically feasible. There is an effort by the Waterfront Regeneration Trust, the charity leading the partnership of communities the Trail connects, to expand and improve the route. Their partnership with local, regional, and Provincial governments has yielded several successes, including the Ministry of Transportation's addition of paved shoulders on roughly 50km of Highway 17 between Sault Ste Marie and Greater Sudbury, where the route could use no other roads.

The Waterfront Regeneration Trail is focused on creating a cycling route around the Great Lakes, and has big expansion plans and dreams for the coming years to increase significantly its mileage. Some of the biggest deterrents for cycle tourists are poor road conditions that force cyclists into traffic and a lack of good signage.

== Facts and figures ==
Length

- Over 3000 km (2236 miles) designated (signed)
- 700 km (434 miles) undesignated on a 2018-2020 expansion route between Collingwood and Sudbury,
- Roughly 50km (31 miles) undesignated gaps in the route

Includes

- 155 communities
- 3 Great Lakes, touching a fourth, Lake Superior
- 520 waterfront parks and natural areas
- 42 Provincial Parks
- 6 National Parks and 23 national historical sites
- 239 beaches, including 21 Blue Flag Beaches
- 152 arts and culture heritage attractions
- 37 major annual waterfront festivals
- 170 marinas and yacht clubs
- 21 Bike Friendly Communities
- 50+ major connecting trails

== See also ==
- Martin Goodman Trail
- Bruce Trail
- List of rail trails in Canada
