= Johnson, Ontario =

Johnson
- Township (single-tier)
- Township of Johnson
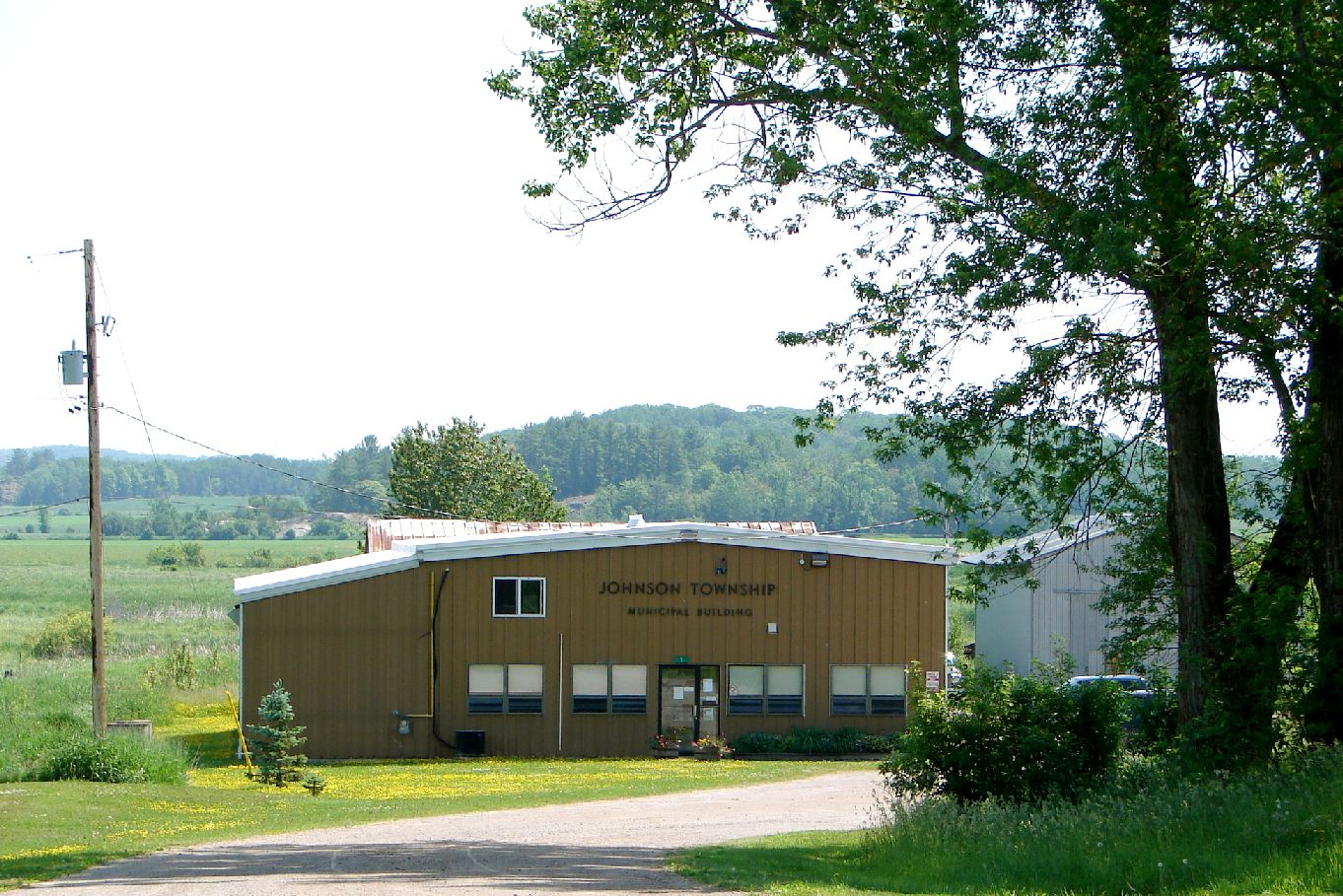
- Municipal building in Desbarats

- Location within Ontario
- Coordinates: 46°20′N 83°56′W
- Country: Canada
- Province: Ontario
- District: Algoma
- Incorporated: 1889

Government
  - Type: Township
  - Mayor: Reginald McKinnon
  - MP: Terry Sheehan (Liberal)
  - MPP: Bill Rosenberg (PC)

Area
  - Land: 119.47 km^{2} (46.13 sq mi)

Population (2021)
  - Total: 749
  - Density: 6.3/km^{2} (16/sq mi)
- Time zone: UTC-5 (EST)
  - Summer (DST): UTC-4 (EDT)
- Postal code: P0R 1E0
- Area codes: 705, 249
- Website: www.johnsontownship.ca

Johnson is a township in the Canadian province of Ontario, located within the Algoma District. The township had a population of 749 in the 2021 Canadian census, down from 751 in the 2016 census.

== Communities ==
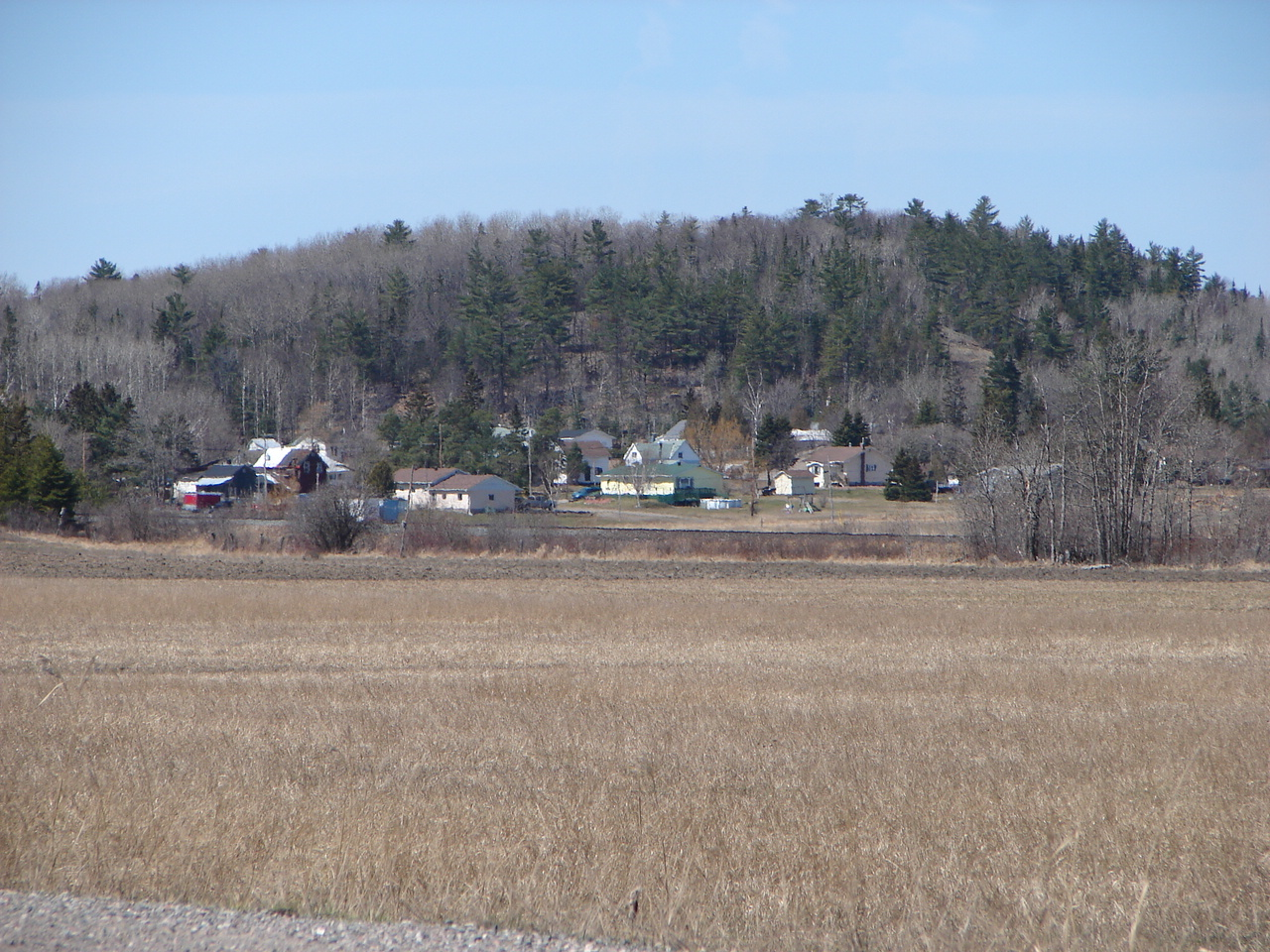
Desbarats

Desbarats, the main community in the township, is located on Highway 17, 54 kilometres (34 mi) east of Sault Ste. Marie.

Located in Desbarats is Central Algoma Secondary School, a public high school of 250+ students which serves a catchment area extending from Echo Bay to Thessalon. The school (commonly known by the acronym C.A.S.S.) opened in 1972 when the existing high schools in Bruce Mines, Richards Landing (serving St. Joseph Island), and Thessalon were consolidated into the larger new building. In 2013, a grade 7 and 8 program was put into place at the school.

Puddingstone Road in Johnson Township was named for a type of puddingstone locally known as Jasper conglomerate and often found in the area as well as at nearby St. Joseph Island. Puddingstone is a mixture of different sized grains and pebbles held together by finer sand. The type found in this area is St. Joseph Island Puddingstone, which contains red and brown pieces of jasper.

Since the early 2000s, about 20 Mennonite families from Southern Ontario moved to the Desbarats area. Along with other local farmers, they sell their produce at the Desbarats Farmers' Market on Friday evenings and Saturday mornings.

== Demographics ==
In the 2021 Census of Population conducted by Statistics Canada, Johnson had a population of 749 living in 272 of its 422 total private dwellings, a change of −0.3% from its 2016 population of 751. With a land area of 119.47 km^{2} (46.13 sq mi), it had a population density of 6.3/km^{2} (16.2/sq mi) in 2021.

Canada census – Johnson community profile

	2021	2016	2011
Population	749 (-0.3% from 2016)	751 (0.1% from 2011)	750 (7.0% from 2006)
Land area	119.47 km^{2} (46.13 sq mi)	120.27 km^{2} (46.44 sq mi)	120.38 km^{2} (46.48 sq mi)
Population density	6.3/km^{2} (16/sq mi)	6.2/km^{2} (16/sq mi)	6.2/km^{2} (16/sq mi)
Median age	40.4 (M: 40.0, F: 40.8)	44.6 (M: 46.0, F: 43.6)
Private dwellings	422 (total) 272 (occupied)	521 (total)	408 (total)
Median household income	$68,500

References: 2021 2016 2011

Historical census populations – Johnson, Ontario

Year	Pop.	±%
1901	656	—
1911	706	+7.6%
1921	752	+6.5%
1931	713	−5.2%
1941	669	−6.2%
1951	597	−10.8%
1956	595	−0.3%

Year	Pop.	±%
1961	629	+5.7%
1966	586	−6.8%
1971	599	+2.2%
1976	675	+12.7%
1981	754	+11.7%
1986	708	−6.1%
1991	685	−3.2%

Year	Pop.	±%
1996	729	+6.4%
2001	658	−9.7%
2006	701	+6.5%
2011	750	+7.0%
2016	751	+0.1%
2021	749	−0.3%

Source: Statistics Canada

== Heritage attractions ==
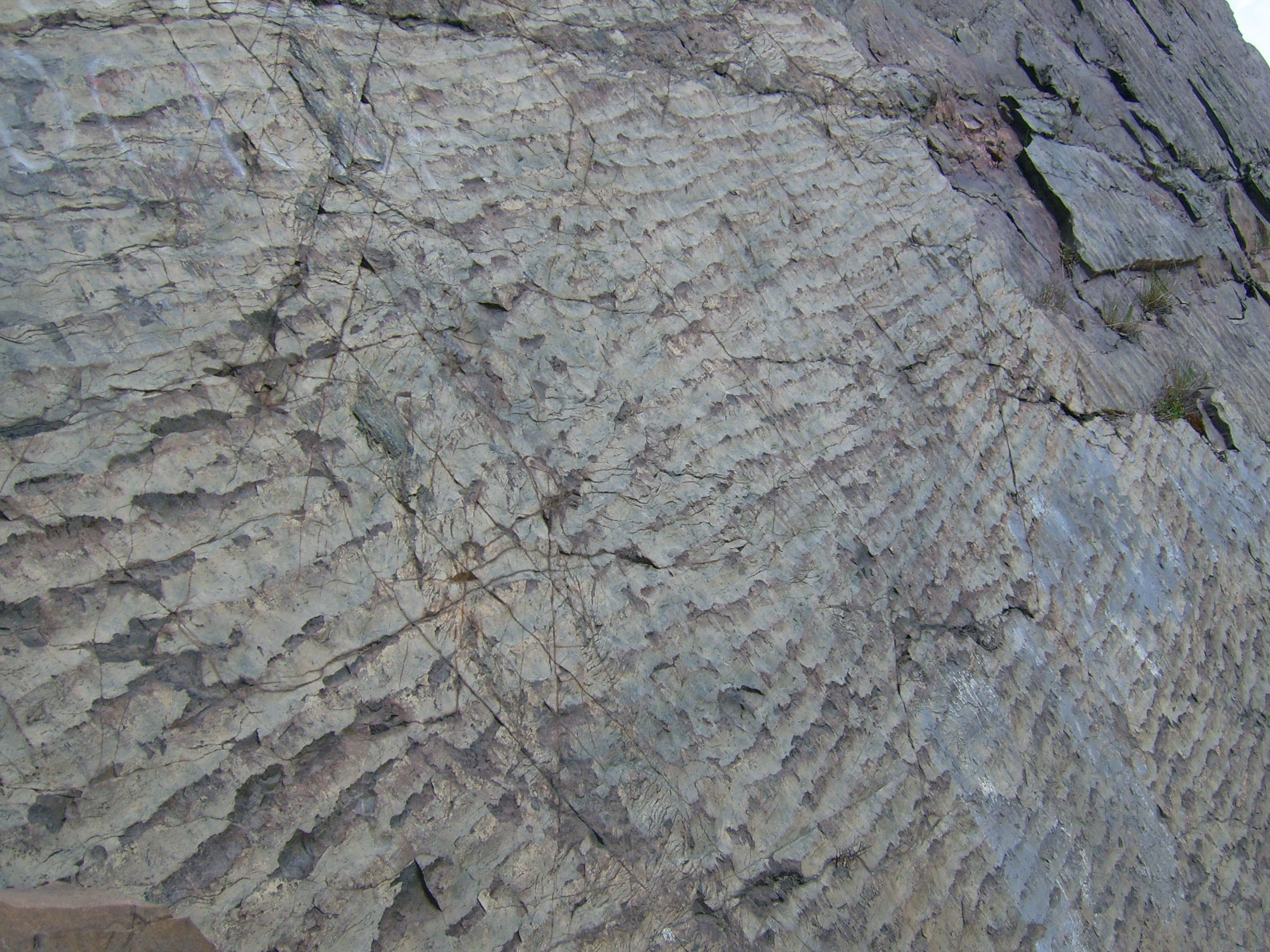
Ripple Rock

Heritage features of significant natural, architectural, and archaeological interest within the municipality include:

- Suddaby grist mill site
- Nanabozho‟s Butt: an odd shaped rock outcrop associated with Ojibwe folklore, west of Kensington Point
- Devil Island Manitou: significant to native culture, located on Devils Island in the St. Marys River
- Ripple Rocks: west of Desbarats on Highway 17, a unique rock cut that was uncovered with the blasting of the rock cuts through northern Ontario for the creation of the Trans-Canada Highway. The ripples in the rock were created two billion years ago by waves in a shallow body of water. It was buried and through pressure it became sandstone.
- The Desbarats caves

== Transportation ==
Ontario Northland provides intercity motor coach service to the main community of Desbarats as a stop along its Sault Ste. Marie–Sudbury–North Bay–Ottawa route, with one bus a day each headed eastbound and westbound from Sunday to Friday, with no service on Saturdays.

== See also ==
- List of townships in Ontario
