= Harmony, Ontario =

Harmony, Ontario can refer to:

- Harmony, Perth County, Ontario
- Harmony, Stormont, Dundas and Glengarry United Counties, Ontario
- Harmony, St. Joseph, Ontario
- Harmony Bay, Unorganized North Algoma District
