= Jocelyn, Ontario =

Jocelyn
- Township (single-tier)
- Township of Jocelyn
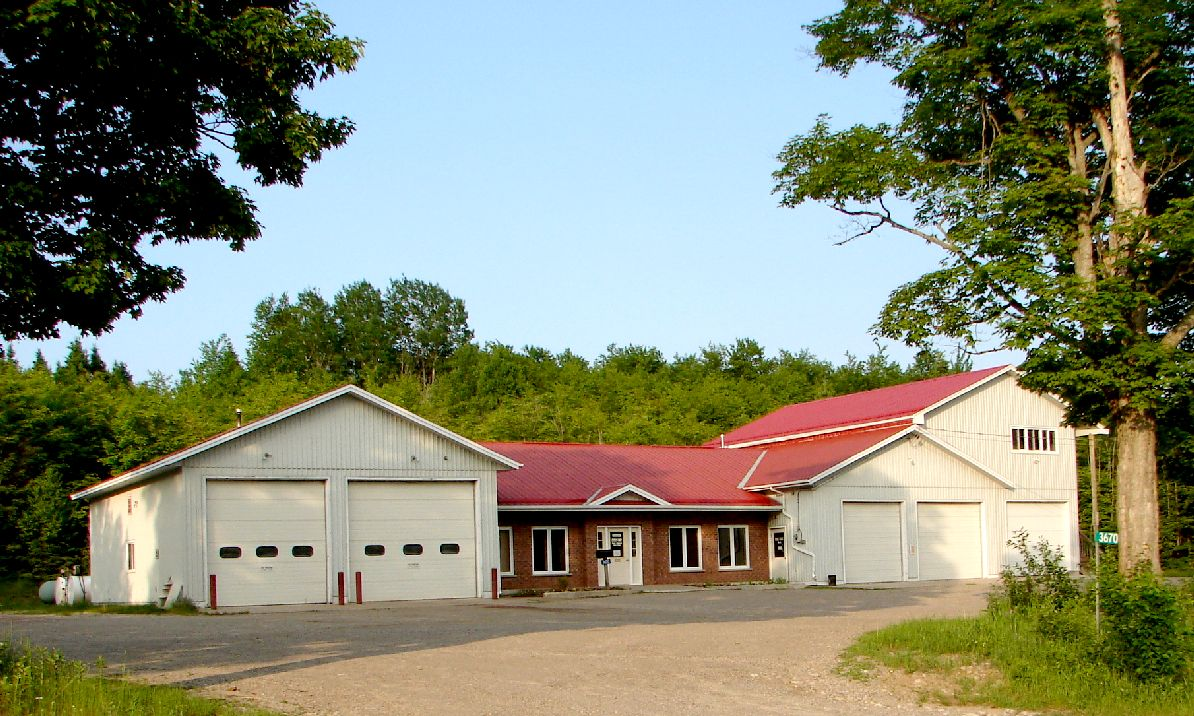
- Municipal building

- Location within Ontario
- Coordinates: 46°11′N 83°58′W
- Country: Canada
- Province: Ontario
- District: Algoma
- Settled: 1830s
- Incorporated: 1886

Government
  - Type: Township
  - Reeve: Cori Murdock
  - Governing Body: Jocelyn Township Council
  - MP: Terry Sheehan (Liberal)
  - MPP: Bill Rosenberg (PC)

Area
  - Total: 130.43 km^{2} (50.36 sq mi)

Population (2021)
  - Total: 314
  - Density: 2.4/km^{2} (6.2/sq mi)
- Time zone: UTC-5 (EST)
  - Summer (DST): UTC-4 (EDT)
- Postal code: P0R 1G0
- Area codes: 705, 249
- Website: jocelyn.ca

Jocelyn is a township in the Canadian province of Ontario, located on St. Joseph Island in the Algoma District. Jocelyn is home to Fort St. Joseph National Historic Site.

The primary community in the township is Kentvale, located on the boundary with the Township of St. Joseph. Other rural communities include Beech Beach (46°06′53″N 86°53′34″W), Carterton (46°11′53″N 83°57′20″W), Outlook (46°10′06″N 83°59′25″W), and Tenby Bay (46°07′51″N 83°55′33″W).

== History ==
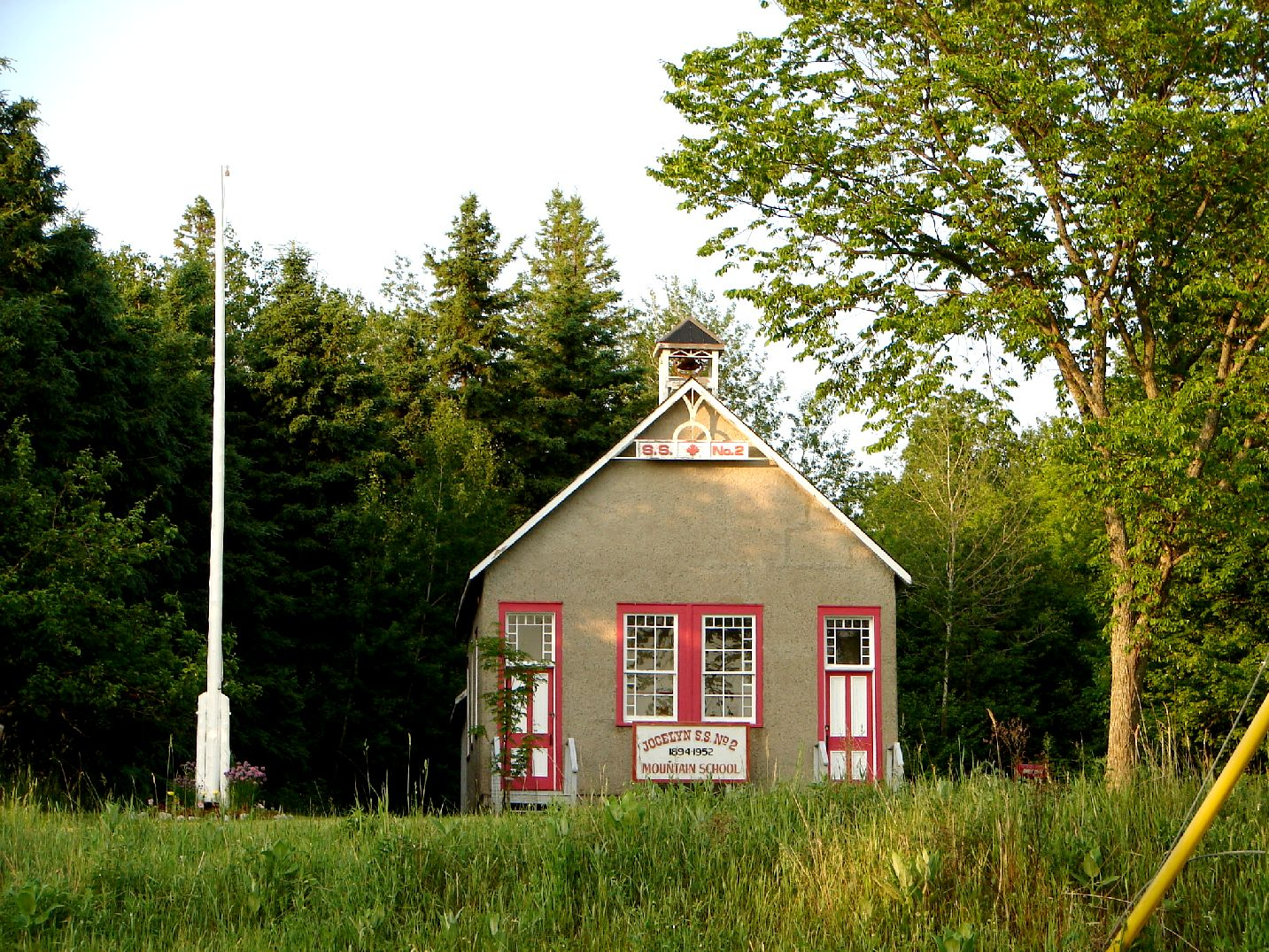
Historic school building

In 1792, the North West Company established a trading post on what is known today as Rains Point. In 1796, Fort St. Joseph was built just to the west. Two years later, the Chippewa sell St. Joseph Island to the English.

Settlement of the township began in 1838 when Major William Kingdom Rains relocated from Milford Haven in neighbouring Hilton Township to a point of land which he named Hentlan (today Rains Point).

In 1881, an Anglican Church was built in Jocelyn, and on July 1 of that same year, the Jocelyn Post Office opened. In 1886, Jocelyn Township was incorporated with Jesse G. Reesor as first reeve.

The Kentvale general store (actually located in the Township of St. Joseph) was opened in 1888 by Emily M. Kent and Frederick B. Kent. The original operation consisted of a grist and saw mill operated by Frederick and a store that Emily ran, operating under the name Kentvale General Merchants. A community outdoor hockey rink on the property provided recreation for this farming community for many years. It was operated by the Kent family and volunteers from the community.

In September 2024, the Ontario Ombudsman released a report on Jocelyn Township council, finding that certain closed meetings did not comply with the Municipal Act’s open meeting requirements and recommending improved transparency and procedural adherence. In 2023 and 2024, the township experienced significant political turmoil, including the resignation of two councillors and senior staff amid allegations of improper governance and hiring practices. An integrity commissioner’s investigation later concluded that Reeve Mark Henderson breached the township’s code of conduct by acting disrespectfully toward the public and failing to follow hiring policies.

== Demographics ==
In the 2021 Census of Population conducted by Statistics Canada, Jocelyn had a population of 314 living in 175 of its 360 total private dwellings, a change of 0.3% from its 2016 population of 313. With a land area of 130.43 km^{2} (50.36 sq mi), it had a population density of 2.4/km^{2} (6.2/sq mi) in 2021.

Canada census – Jocelyn community profile

	2021	2016	2011
Population	314 (+0.3% from 2016)	313 (32.1% from 2011)	237 (-14.4% from 2006)
Land area	130.43 km^{2} (50.36 sq mi)	131.45 km^{2} (50.75 sq mi)	131.37 km^{2} (50.72 sq mi)
Population density	2.4/km^{2} (6.2/sq mi)	2.4/km^{2} (6.2/sq mi)	1.8/km^{2} (4.7/sq mi)
Median age	62.0 (M: 62.0, F: 62.0)	60.8 (M: 61.2, F: 60.5)
Private dwellings	360 (total) 175 (occupied)	340 (total)	309 (total)
Median household income	$66,000	$62,272

References: 2021 2016 2011

Historical census populations – Jocelyn, Ontario

Year	Pop.	±%
1881	413	—
1891	369	−10.7%
1901	452	+22.5%
1911	337	−25.4%
1921	344	+2.1%
1931	226	−34.3%
1941	196	−13.3%
1951	176	−10.2%

Year	Pop.	±%
1956	144	−18.2%
1961	137	−4.9%
1966	98	−28.5%
1971	104	+6.1%
1976	119	+14.4%
1981	144	+21.0%
1986	170	+18.1%
1991	238	+40.0%

Year	Pop.	±%
1996	294	+23.5%
2001	298	+1.4%
2006	277	−7.0%
2011	237	−14.4%
2016	313	+32.1%
2021	314	+0.3%

Source: Statistics Canada

== See also ==
- List of francophone communities in Ontario
- List of townships in Ontario
