= Hilton, Ontario =

Hilton
- Township (single-tier)
- Township of Hilton
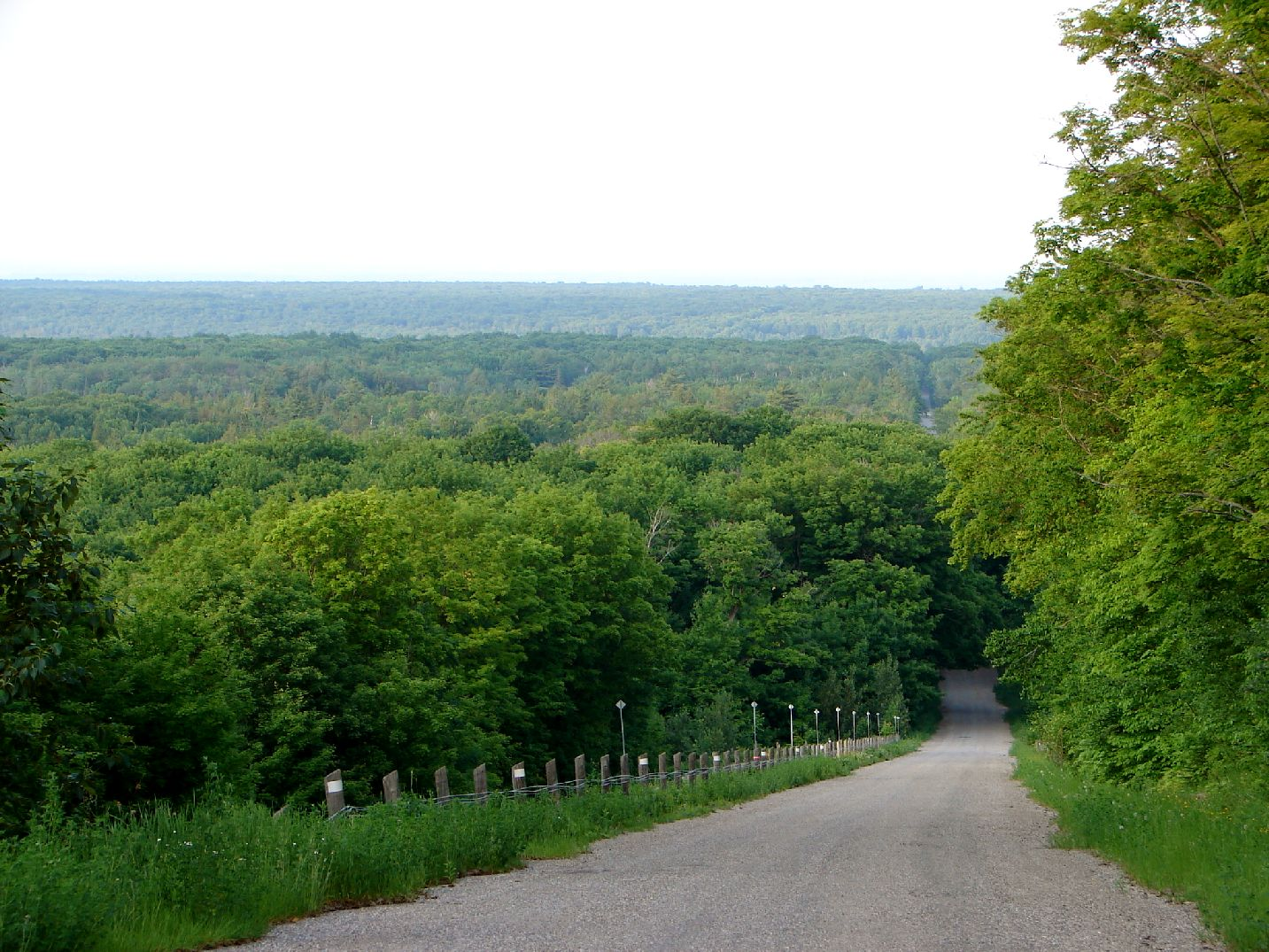

- Location within Ontario
- Coordinates: 46°13′N 83°53′W
- Country: Canada
- Province: Ontario
- District: Algoma
- Settled: 1830s
- Incorporated: 1883

Government
  - Type: Township
  - Reeve: Rodney Wood
  - Governing Body: Hilton Township Council
  - MP: Terry Sheehan (Liberal)
  - MPP: Bill Rosenberg (PC)

Area
  - Land: 114.77 km^{2} (44.31 sq mi)

Population (2021)
  - Total: 38.2
  - Density: 3.3/km^{2} (8.5/sq mi)
- Time zone: UTC-5 (EST)
  - Summer (DST): UTC-4 (EDT)
- Postal code: P0R 1G0
- Area codes: 705, 249
- Website: www.hiltontownship.ca

Hilton is a township in the Canadian province of Ontario, comprising the southeast quadrant of St. Joseph Island in the Algoma District. It surrounds, but does not include, the independent village of Hilton Beach.

The township contains the rural community of Milford Haven (46°9′21″N 83°49′43″W).

== History ==
St. Joseph Island was originally Ojibway territory. In 1798, the Ojibway signed a treaty and sold the island to the British. By the late 1830s, Major William Rains had obtained a charter to colonize the island, and established Milford Haven (named after a seaside resort in Wales near Rains' hometown), complete with a store and saw mill in the southeast of the island.

In 1883, Hilton Township was incorporated. In 1923, the Village of Hilton Beach was incorporated to form a separate municipality from the township.

== Demographics ==
In the 2021 Census of Population conducted by Statistics Canada, Hilton had a population of 382 living in 162 of its 335 total private dwellings, a change of 24.4% from its 2016 population of 307. With a land area of 114.77 km^{2} (44.31 sq mi), it had a population density of 3.3/km^{2} (8.6/sq mi) in 2021.

Canada census – Hilton community profile

	2021	2016	2011
Population	382 (+24.4% from 2016)	307 (+17.6% from 2011)	261 (+7.4% from 2006)
Land area	114.77 km^{2} (44.31 sq mi)	115.82 km^{2} (44.72 sq mi)	115.78 km^{2} (44.70 sq mi)
Population density	3.3/km^{2} (8.5/sq mi)	2.7/km^{2} (7.0/sq mi)	2.3/km^{2} (6.0/sq mi)
Median age	56.8 (M: 56.8, F: 57.2)	58.5 (M: 58.8, F: 56.8)
Private dwellings	335 (total) 162 (occupied)	317 (total) 136 (occupied)	367 (total)
Median household income	$76,000	$68,864

References: 2021 2016 2011

Historical census populations – Hilton, Ontario

Year	Pop.	±%
1881	415	—
1891	389	−6.3%
1901	407	+4.6%
1911	378	−7.1%
1921	522	+38.1%
1931	237	−54.6%
1941	182	−23.2%
1951	90	−50.5%

Year	Pop.	±%
1956	100	+11.1%
1961	116	+16.0%
1966	105	−9.5%
1971	94	−10.5%
1976	126	+34.0%
1981	144	+14.3%
1986	173	+20.1%
1991	231	+33.5%

Year	Pop.	±%
1996	255	+10.4%
2001	258	+1.2%
2006	243	−5.8%
2011	261	+7.4%
2016	307	+17.6%
2021	382	+24.4%

Population counts are not adjusted for boundary changes.
Source: Statistics Canada

== See also ==
- List of townships in Ontario
