= St. Joseph Island (Ontario) =

Canadian island in northwestern Lake Huron

Native name: Anipich or Payentanassin (Ojibwe) Nickname: St. Joe
- Location within Canada

Geography
- Location: Lake Huron, east of the mouth of the St. Marys River.
- Coordinates: 46°13′11″N 83°56′47″W
- Archipelago: Manitoulin archipelago
- Area: 365 km^{2} (141 sq mi)
- Length: 30 km (19 mi)
- Width: 20 km (12 mi)
- Coastline: 145 km (90.1 mi)
- Highest elevation: 335 m (1099 ft)
- Highest point: Carterton

Administration
- Canada
- Province: Ontario
- District: Algoma District
- Largest settlement: Richards Landing (Township of St. Joseph)

Demographics
- Demonym: St. Joseph Islander
- Population: 2,320 (2021)
- Pop. density: 6.36/km^{2} (16.47/sq mi)

Additional information
- Time zone: EST (UTC– 05:00)
  - Summer (DST): EDT (UTC– 04:00)
- Postal code: P0R 1G0, P0R 1J0
- Area code: 705

St. Joseph Island is in the northwestern part of Lake Huron. It is part of the Canadian province of Ontario. At 365 km^{2} (141 sq mi) in area, it is the sixth largest lake island in the world; the second largest island on Lake Huron, following Manitoulin Island; and the third largest of all the islands on the Great Lakes, trailing Manitoulin and Lake Superior's Isle Royale.

The island lies approximately 45 km (28 mi) south east of the city of Sault Ste. Marie and 225 km (140 mi) south west of Sudbury.

St. Joseph Island has two population centres, Richards Landing with approximately 400 residents and the village of Hilton Beach with approximately 200 people.

The island is the largest centre of maple syrup production in Ontario, with nearly 30 companies producing 18 per cent of the province's maple syrup. Its location on the Great Lakes, ease of reach by road and boat and the availability of local services have made it a destination for tourists and cottagers in northeastern Ontario.

St. Joseph Island played an important role for First Nations and Europeans in the early fur trade and as a staging point for the first victory for British North America in the War of 1812. The island is the subject of one of the Upper Canada Land Surrender treaties conducted by the British government and First Nations in the period between the end of the American Revolution and Confederation.

== History ==
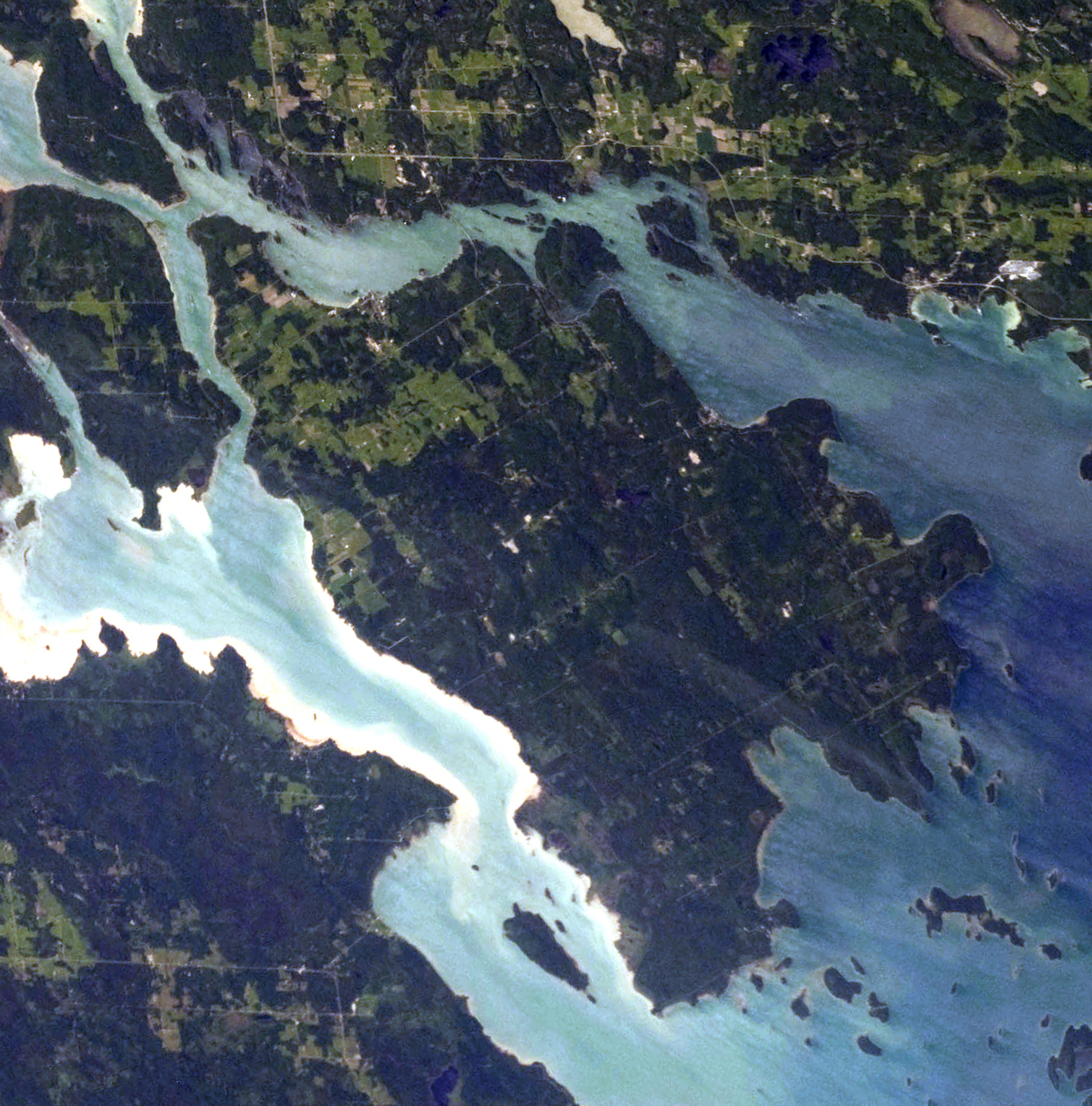
This satellite image shows St. Joseph Island, Ontario located near the mouth of the St. Marys River in northwestern Lake Huron.

=== Indigenous peoples ===
Unlike neighbouring islands, little evidence has been found of early human activity on St. Joseph Island. Archeologists have found very little to confirm settlement, farming or hunting on the island before the 17th century.

It is speculated that the first humans to see St. Joseph Island and set foot on it were the hunter-gatherers of the Plano cultures who travelled north from the Great Plains of the continent between 9000 BCE and 6000 BCE. These peoples followed the bison and other animals into the areas revealed by retreating glaciers. Evidence of Plano migrations—particularly projectile point tools—has been found in the Great Lakes basin from Lake Superior through the St. Marys River to the North Channel of Lake Huron.

By about 5000 BCE, St. Joseph Island would have formed part of the boundary between the Laurentian Archaic and the Shield Archaic peoples. The Laurentian people, hunters and fishers who came from the southeast, settled in the lower St. Lawrence and eastern Great Lakes region. The Shield people, likely descendants of the Plano, came south from the Tyrrell Sea (a much larger Hudson Bay) and travelled along the northern shores of lakes that are today Superior and Huron.

=== European exploration ===
By the time the Europeans began arriving in the 1630s, the north channel of Lake Huron was shared by the Ojibwe, Odawa and Potawatomi whose Algonkian ancestors had come from the east around 1200. The very first European believed to have seen the island would have been Étienne Brûlé whose 1621 voyage to the mouth of Lake Superior took him, together with his Wendat (Huron) guides, along the north channel of Lake Huron north of the island.

St. Joseph Island became a strategic mid-way point for French explorers, missionaries and fur traders on the long voyage between Quebec and Lake Superior. In addition to its geographic convenience, St. Joseph Island would have offered opportunities to rest on the voyage between the strategic centres of Sault Ste. Marie and Mackinac, fishing, hunting as well as gathering seasonal native berries.

St. Joseph Island first appeared on European maps in the 1670s. A map by French explorer René de Bréhant de Galinée labels it "Anipich", after a Ojibwe word meaning "place of the hardwood trees". The Ojibwe would call the island "Payentanassin" as well. But by the 1740s the island came to be called "Saint Joseph" by Europeans, presumably so-named by Jesuit missionaries in honour of the church they were building on the island. A 1735 French map is believed to be the first to use the name "Isle St. Joseph". A detailed 1744 map by French geographer Jacques Nicolas Bellin depicts a route for batteau north east of the island and a canoe route on the south west, however it shows no mission or settlement real or abandoned anywhere on the island. The name "Cariboux Island" was also given to the island briefly in the 1790s, though this only appears on a British map of the St. Marys River of the early 1790s and is used incidentally within the St. Joseph Island Treaty in 1798.

=== British North America and Fort St. Joseph ===
Any claim that France may have had to all or any portion of St. Joseph Island ended with the conclusion of the Seven Years' War in 1763. Under the terms of treaty, France relinquished virtually all of its interests in North America to the British. For the first time, the British and their First Nations allies were unchallenged on the Great Lakes. Included in the French assets was the strategically important fort at the Straits of Mackinac between lakes Huron and Michigan 50 km (31 mi) west of St. Joseph Island. From Fort Mackinac, the British were able to control the flow of trade in and out of Lake Michigan.

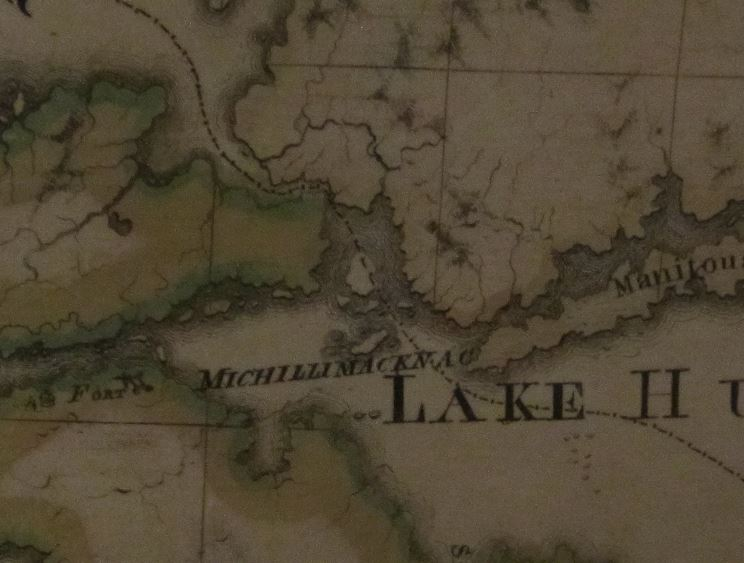
This detail of Abel Buell's famous 1783 map shows the international border appearing to divide St. Joseph Island between the United States and British North America.

However, British superiority on the lakes did not last long. By 1783 the Treaty of Paris had ended the American Revolution and established the boundary between the newly independent United States of America and British North America as running "through the middle of said Lake Huron to the water communication between that Lake and Lake Superior..." While the treaty very clearly placed Mackinac Island on the American side, the text was far less clear about how St. Joseph and its neighbouring islands that fell in the middle of the St. Marys River were to be apportioned. For instance, an influential map produced by American engraver Abel Buell based on the treaty instructions appears to divide St. Joseph in half.

For a time, the British exploited this uncertainty as well as the relatively weak American administration in their newly acquired territory, to keep a British garrison at Fort Mackinac. However, this arrangement would soon become untenable. Under the Jay-Grenville Treaty of 1794 the United Kingdom agreed to US demands that it abandon Mackinac and five other forts in US territory on the Great Lakes by June 1796. The British knew they would need to hastily establish new posts in British North America from which to protect its claim to the fur trade and retain influence with the aboriginal peoples. However, there was great dispute among British officials where these new posts should be located and whether one was needed west of the Detroit River at all.

As a first step, the Governor of British North America, Lord Dorchester sent a team of British Royal Engineers led by Lieutenant Alexander Bryce to survey the area from the Straits of Mackinac to Lake Superior to attempt to clarify the boundary left unclear by the Treaty of Paris and to locate a suitable site for a new fort. In his report, the chief surveyor wrote "St. Joseph's [sic] Island is a very fine island about 27 miles [43 km] long, one of a numerous group that lies in the straits separating Lake Huron from Lake Superior. It is naturally fertile and well suited to cultivation but not so well fitted for military purposes. However, I have claimed it for the British crown and built a stockade."

Initially, officials in Quebec felt the island was too remote a location for a fort. Principally, it was Dorchester who was opposed to a garrison on the upper Great Lakes. He felt the strongest defensive position in the event of an American attack would be to concentrate the relatively thin British forces closer to the strategic centres of Quebec and Montreal. Upper Canada, he felt, was indefensible and not worth defending if it meant losing Quebec. However, Sir John Graves Simcoe, the lieutenant governor of Upper Canada disagreed. He was insistent that a fort on Lake Huron was essential to promote good relations with First Nations people whose support was essential to secure British North America from the expansionist Americans. Land grants to the Americans resulting from the Treaty of Paris and the Jay Treaty had left First Nations feeling badly betrayed by the British. To Simcoe, abandoning Lake Huron entirely would do nothing to repair relations and would only add to their discontent. Simcoe pressed forcefully for a garrison on the lake, though his preference was for Penetanguishene, some 400 km (250 mi) east of St. Joseph Island. Simcoe argued against St. Joseph, citing the then still ambiguous border on the Great Lakes to say that the island was outside British territory; writing in 1794 that "from the map of the Sault of St. Mary's in Charlevoix which I have generally found to be true it would appear that the Island of St. Joseph by treaty is within the line of the United States."

Nevertheless, following a year of consideration, Dorchester relented and settled on St. Joseph Island as the site for the new fort to replace Mackinac. The site was preferred to other locations on the mainland including Thessalon and Sault Ste. Marie as it had a relatively deep shoreline suited to large vessels. On April 11, 1796, Dorchester ordered a garrison of 14 men to set up a camp on the southwest corner of the island close to the channel between Mackinac and Sault Ste. Marie in order to prevent the island being claimed by the Americans. This advance detachment, led by Lieutenant Andrew Foster of the Queen's Rangers identified a spot of high ground nearby to suitable for a fort. In accordance with the Jay-Grenville Treaty, the British abandoned Mackinac Island in June 1796 to establish a new fort on the southeastern corner of the island. Subsequently, commanders in Quebec sent orders on July 5, 1796, that the garrison occupying the island could not be removed except on orders from the Governor General.

Instrument of treaty between seven principal chiefs of the Chippewa (Ojibwe) Nation and the United Kingdom of Great Britain for the Island of St. Joseph dated June 30, 1798.

Though it was generally unpopulated to that point, the island was understood to be the territory of the Ojibwe who in time began visiting the new fort and asking about payment for the island. On June 16, 1798, the deputy superintendent of Indian affairs, Alexander McKee departed Amherstburg on the Detroit River on the ship Francis to negotiate with Ojibwe chiefs for the purchase of St. Joseph Island, held under lease to that point. On June 30, 1798, the Ojibwe agreed to sell the island to the British for £1,200 Quebec currency of trade goods, an annual gift exchange and the right to continue to harvest the island and bury their dead there. The St. Joseph Island Treaty, or "St. Joseph's Island Treaty No. 11" is one of the Upper Canada Land Surrender treaties conducted by the British government and First Nations in the period between the end of the American Revolution and Canadian Confederation.

That summer, Royal Engineers led by Lieutenant George Landmann were sent from Quebec with general instructions to build a fort consisting of a blockhouse, guard house, powder magazine, Indian council house, bake house, and storehouse for the Indian Department all of which would be enclosed on a stockade, as well as a wharf on to Lake Huron. Landmann took three summers to complete the fort, returning to Quebec in the winters.

In time, Fort St. Joseph became an important point for trade and commerce in the region, receiving vessels and their goods from Detroit, Mackinac and Sault Ste. Marie. Settlers, many of whom had lived near the fort at Mackinac as well as merchants of the Northwest Company followed the garrison to establish the first permanent European settlement on the island around Fort St. Joseph. However, conditions at the fort and settlement were grim for soldiers and settlers alike, particularly in the winter months. The commandant, Lieutenant Robert Cowell complained to his superiors that all the fort's buildings were drafty and susceptible to snow and rain. A fire in January 1802 destroyed the bakehouse; the other buildings were saved by villagers and soldiers fighting the flames. Desertions were a frequent occurrence, with soldiers recovered having frozen to death, or requiring amputation of frost-bitten limbs.

Conditions were not a great deal better for the Ojibwe who had come to depend upon trade with the fort. John Askin Jr., the appointed storekeeper described the situation to his brother in January 1808: "To give you some idea of this place, first its an Island abounding with Rocks, and not a Deer, Bear, Racoon, Moose, Cariboux or Muskrat about it. A few Hares is caught and pheasants. The Indians live entirely on fish. They make their mokasins with the skins of sturgeon and Lace their snow shoes with the same skin ... They have sold to the [merchants] only 5 Bever skins, 20 Martins, and 8 Fox skins which is the whole [amount] of the Hunt of upwards of 120 Men since 24th of Sept. last."

A reciprocity agreement reached in early 1808 between Britain and the United States on the import and export of furs put additional pressure on economic activity at St. Joseph as the trading companies deemed it more affordable to pay duties to trade at Mackinac than to sell for lower prices at St. Joseph Island.

At the start of the War of 1812, Fort St. Joseph was the most westerly British outpost in Upper Canada. Within weeks of the commencement of hostilities, a contingent of 160 Canadian voyageurs and First Nations, along with 30 British regulars and two field pieces led by British Captain Charles Roberts moved from Fort St. Joseph to reclaim the fort at Mackinac Island. Abandoned, Fort St. Joseph was burned by a U.S. force in July 1814. As a result of shifting strategic considerations and the decline of the fur trade, the British did not rebuild the Fort St. Joseph following the war. In 1974, the ruins became a National Historic Site administered by Parks Canada.

=== Border on the Great Lakes ===
British and American negotiators to the 1814 Treaty of Ghent ended the war by offering no territorial concessions to either side, but returned to those boundaries set by the Treaty of Paris. However, in order to resolve territorial claims that had precipitated the war, negotiators at Ghent established a process whereby commissioners would survey the boundary to determine the borders envisioned in the original treaty.

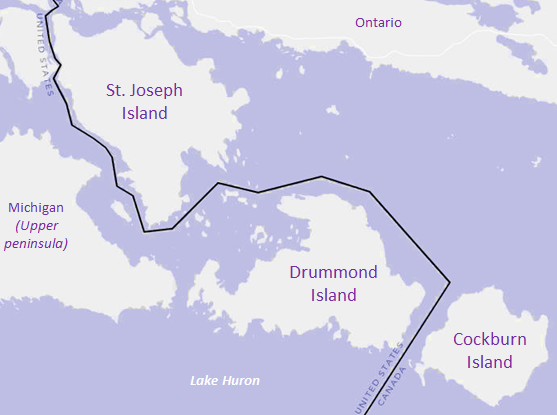
St. Joseph, Drummond and Cockburn islands and the placement of the international boundary agreed to in 1822 and 1842

Beginning in August 1820, two teams of surveyors, including British explorer and cartographer David Thompson, mapped the area of St. Joseph Island, Drummond Island, and Lesser and Greater Manitou Islands (today Cockburn Island and Manitoulin Island). Mapping this corner of Lake Huron was a challenge given how little was actually known about the shores and depths of the channels between the islands. The agent for the American survey team, Major Joseph Delafield complained "No map that I have seen has any truth as it respects the position of Drummond's or the other islands about St. Marys. We entered this bay without a pilot, but are told we cannot proceed up river without one."

Relying on the surveys taken in the summers of 1820 and 1821, the commissioners, Anthony Barclay of the United Kingdom and the American General Peter B. Porter met in New York City for four weeks in November and December 1821. They were guided by four principles: first, that the boundary would not divide islands; that the boundary would follow the most navigable channel; where several navigable channels existed, the boundary would go through the one with the largest body of water; and in cases where there were several channels, the boundary would be drawn to ensure that good navigation would be left to both parties. The commissioners also kept an informal process to apportion islands equally between the two countries. In their final report, the commissioners agreed to grant St. Joseph Island and Cockburn Island to Canada and Drummond Island between them to the United States. Importantly, they also placed the border along the western shore of St. Joseph between it and St. Tammany (today Neebish) Island.

However, the commissioners were unable to agree on where the border should go upon exiting the channel between St. Joseph and St. Tammany. This question would wait another 20 years until the 1842 Webster–Ashburton Treaty finally established the boundary "along the ship channel between Saint Joseph and St. Tammany Islands, to the division of the channel at or near the head of St. Joseph's Island [sic]; thence, turning eastwardly and northwardly, around the lower end of SE George's or Sugar Island" so as to assign Sugar Island to the United States.

=== Settlement ===
From the end of the war until 1829, St. Joseph Island was virtually uninhabited. Exploring a creek in the southeast corner of the island, one of the commission survey teams reported "a neat log house far up in the woods, with a patch of Indian corn, and other vegetables. It was inhabited by an Indian widow and her daughter. Nothing could exceed the cleanliness of the lodge in the wilderness. The surveyors saw no one else on the island and reported it as a jungle containing only bears and other wild animals."

The boundary commission process, combined with the demilitarization of the Great Lakes under the Rush–Bagot Treaty of 1817, offered greater certainty in the region. Increasingly Europeans began to see St. Joseph Island and its environs for their abundant resources and potential for settlement.

Among the first to see this potential was Major William Kingdom Rains. A veteran of British wars in Europe, Rains resigned the military in 1830 to start a new life in British North America. In 1834, Lieutenant Governor John Colborne allowed Rains to purchase over 2,200 hectares (5,400 acres) to start a colony on St. Joseph Island. Rains, his family and a company of investors established Milford Haven—named after a seaside resort near Rains' hometown in Wales—complete with a store and saw mill in the southeast of the island. However, very few settlers came to the island. By 1836, Rains, short on capital for the settlement due to poor investments of his agent, had become estranged from his fellow investors and relocated to a point of land not far from the site of Fort St. Joseph which he named Hentlan (today, Rains Point). Rains' wife Frances and her sister Eliza bore nineteen of Rains' children, many of whom remained in the area. His son Tudor Rains would go on to establish a successful store at Sailors Encampment on the northwest of the island.

A government report on the progress of the settlement in July 1839 found only 10 small homes at the Milford Haven, several of which were occupied by French Canadians and Métis fishermen who had been living on the island prior to the start of Rains' colony. The only other occupant was an American store owner who was shipping fish and a sizable amount of maple syrup by schooner to Detroit and Chicago.

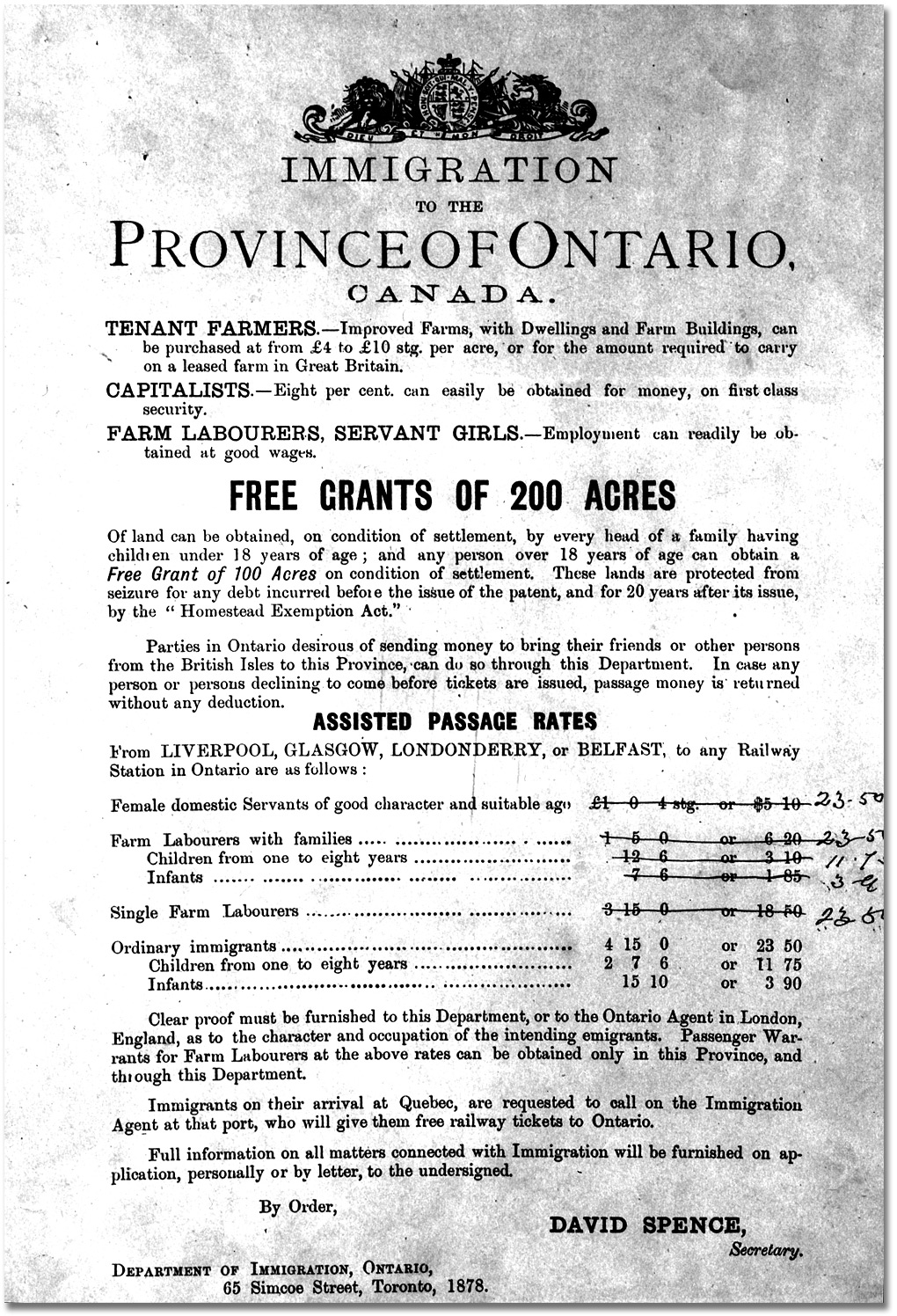
Poster of 1878 advertising immigration to Ontario, promising land grants of up to 200 acres (81 ha)

Beginning in the mid-1850s, population growth of the island began to shift from the south and west to better agricultural land in the north. Government policies including the Free Grants and Homestead Act of 1868, encouraged would-be farmers in the south of Ontario to relocate to tracts of land in Algoma by providing up to two hundred acres of land per head of household. The greatest influx of settlers came between 1874 and 1882.

John Richards moved to St. Joseph Island from Sault Ste. Marie in 1876 and founded Richards Landing. Two years later, businessman John Marks moved from Bruce Mines and founded Marksville, which was incorporated as the Village of Hilton Beach in 1923.

Two lumber mills began operating on the island in the early 1880s. In 1912, the Stone Lumber Company at Marksville had added 13 km (8.1 mi) of railroad with a locomotive to reach dense woodlots up the mountain and deliver timber to the mill. For a time both the train and mill were operated around the clock. By the end of the 1910s, the mill had produced and shipped two and a half million board feet of maple and pine lumber around the world. The rail line operated for almost 25 years until mill ceased operation in the depression of the 1930s and the tracks were dismantled.

The completion of the Canadian Pacific Railway spur from Sudbury across the north channel to Sault Ste. Marie in 1887 opened up the region to migration by farmers and settlers. In 1909, a group of capitalists proposed a plan to connect the island to the CPR line from Richards Landing. While local residents contributed to the financing for the project, nothing came of it. A rough roadway followed the CPR line so that by 1923, the communities along the channel were connected to Sault Ste. Marie by road.

By the 1890s, regular steamer traffic was a feature of the upper Great Lakes, providing passenger service and routine mail delivery. Steamboats of the Great Northern Transit Company served Hilton and Richards Landing and marketed the stops as destinations for tourists on their Georgian Bay Route connecting the island to Collingwood, Owen Sound, Parry Sound and Sault Ste. Marie.

At the close of the 1800s and beginning of the 1900s, it became very fashionable among wealthy Americans and others to have summer residences along the Great Lakes and St. Lawrence River. While the Thousand Islands region attracted the well-heeled of New York state, those from the US Midwest sought to establish resorts on islands accessible by steamboat on the Great Lakes. In 1898, H.W. Evenden, the son of a wealthy English draper purchased Campement d'Ours Island adjacent to the west-north-west corner of St. Joseph Island and built a large manor house. An eccentric, Evenden planned to bring Himalayan goats to the island and start a Gruyere cheese factory. He boasted to a newspaper of the abundant fishing in the area and the ease of flagging down passing steamers for transportation. Evenden sold the island to Arnold Scudder in 1902 who promptly began marketing several lots to wealthy Americans. As an attraction, he built a replica of the blockhouse on Fort Mackinac which was used later as a cottage by Michigan governor Chase Osborn. In 1900, Chicago merchant Edward H. Pitkin purchased Sapper Island to the west of Campement d'Ours Island and asked his neighbour Frank Lloyd Wright, then an apprentice architect, to design him a home. Completed in 1902, the 130 m^{2} Pitkin Cottage is one of only two, and the only surviving, buildings designed by the American architect in Canada. In 1916, the cottage was purchased from Pitkin by another Illinois businessman, James Heyworth.

Electrical power came to St. Joseph Island in the 1930s, with a few commercial and residential customers connected in Richards Landing and Hilton Beach in the summer of 1933. The community of Kentvale was included later in the decade. Street lights were installed in the villages in 1947.

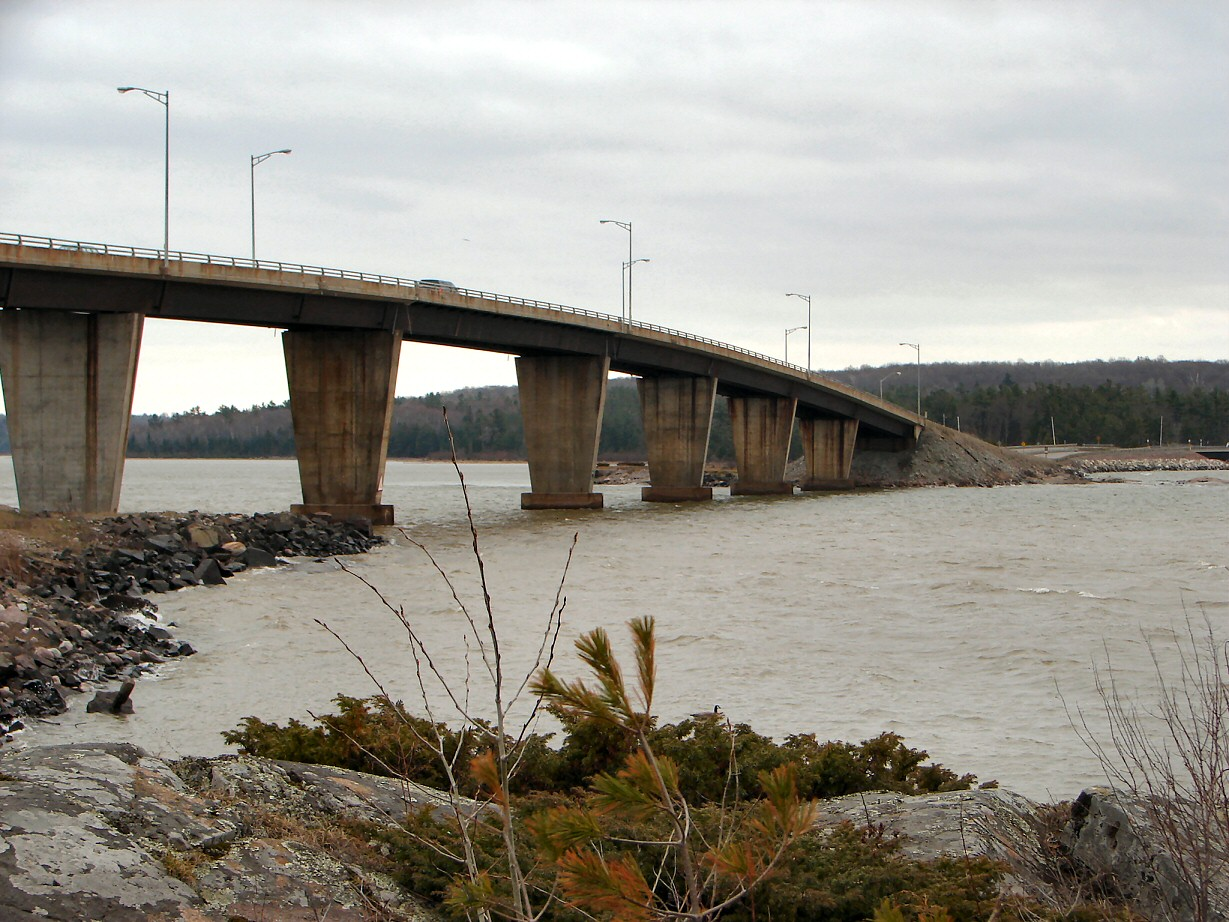
The St. Joseph Island Bernt Gilbertson Bridge, opened in 1972, is seen leading to the island

Beginning in 1953, a government-run diesel ferry, the St. Joseph Islander, operated from Humbug Point providing free, 24-hour access to the island for residents, cottagers and tourists. Before this, Islanders had relied upon two cable ferries. The first began operating in 1919 and ran on a 610-metre (2,000 ft) cable between Campement D'Ours Island and the mainland. The second ferry, the Magic Carpet operated from Pine Island to the mainland. In 1934, both ferries were sold to the provincial government which began providing a free service.

The ferry was retired in 1972 when a bridge was constructed. In December 1994, the bridge was named the Bernt Gilbertson St. Joseph Island Bridge in honour of Bernt Gilbertson, an island resident and member of provincial parliament who had long petitioned for the bridge.

== Geography ==
St. Joseph Island is located near the south easterly mouth of the St. Marys River in northwestern Lake Huron. It is the most westerly of the Manitoulin chain of islands.

The island is 365 km^{2} (141 sq mi) in area. On its longest—northeast to southwest—axis the island is about 30 km (19 mi) and about 20 km (12 mi) at its widest point. The circumference of the island's coastline is 145 km (90 mi).

Its highest point, known colloquially and by surveyors as "the Mountain", is near the centre of the island near Carterton with an elevation of 345.6 m (1,134 ft), which is about 169 m (554 ft) above Lake Huron.

The island is dotted by nearly 60 small lakes, the largest being Twin Lakes near the centre of the island, Caufield Lake, Otter Lake and Rains Lake. Several rivers and streams cut through the island, the longest being the Koshkawong River connecting Twin Lakes south to the bay at Milford Haven and Two Tree River on the west side of the island.

The island is part of the Great Lakes–St. Lawrence lowlands physiological region, a fertile plain that is composed primarily of post-glacial landforms.

The island was formed by debris and erosion at the end of the last glacial period. As the Laurentide Ice Sheet, a huge glacier extending into the present-northern United States, melted about 11,000 years ago, it carved deep gouges into the earth, scraped off top soil and deposited rock and sand. The glacier's retreat also allowed land compacted by the weight of the ice to rise.

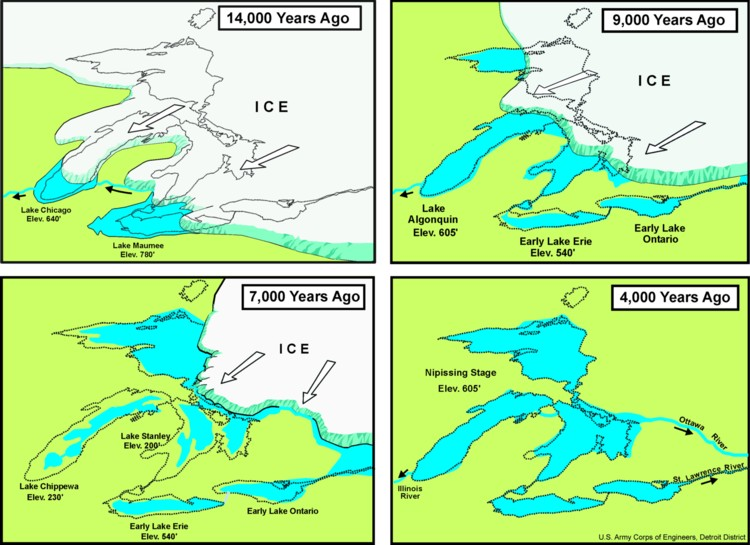
Retreat of the Laurentide Ice Sheet and the stages of the development of the Great Lakes

The Great Lakes were created when their north shore rebounded from the retreating ice, capturing glacial runoff. Initially, the island was submerged entirely up to 75 m (246 ft) under Lake Algonquin, a proglacial lake that existed as a single body of water atop the basins of today's lakes Superior, Huron and Michigan. As the land surface to the lake's south rebounded 9,000 years ago, it began draining eastward through the North Bay outlet towards the ancestral Ottawa River, resulting in a low water Lake Stanley in the Huron basin, during which St. Joseph Island was part of the mainland.

The land mass that is recognizable as St. Joseph Island today emerged 5,000 years ago as glacial uplift closed off the North Bay outlet capturing glacial runoff in the Lake Huron basin. During this period, the island's shorelines were carved out by continued glacial runoff that flowed from the west, forming the coasts of the St. Marys River and Lake Huron that surround the island.

The 84th degree west latitude passes through St. Joseph Island.

=== Geology ===
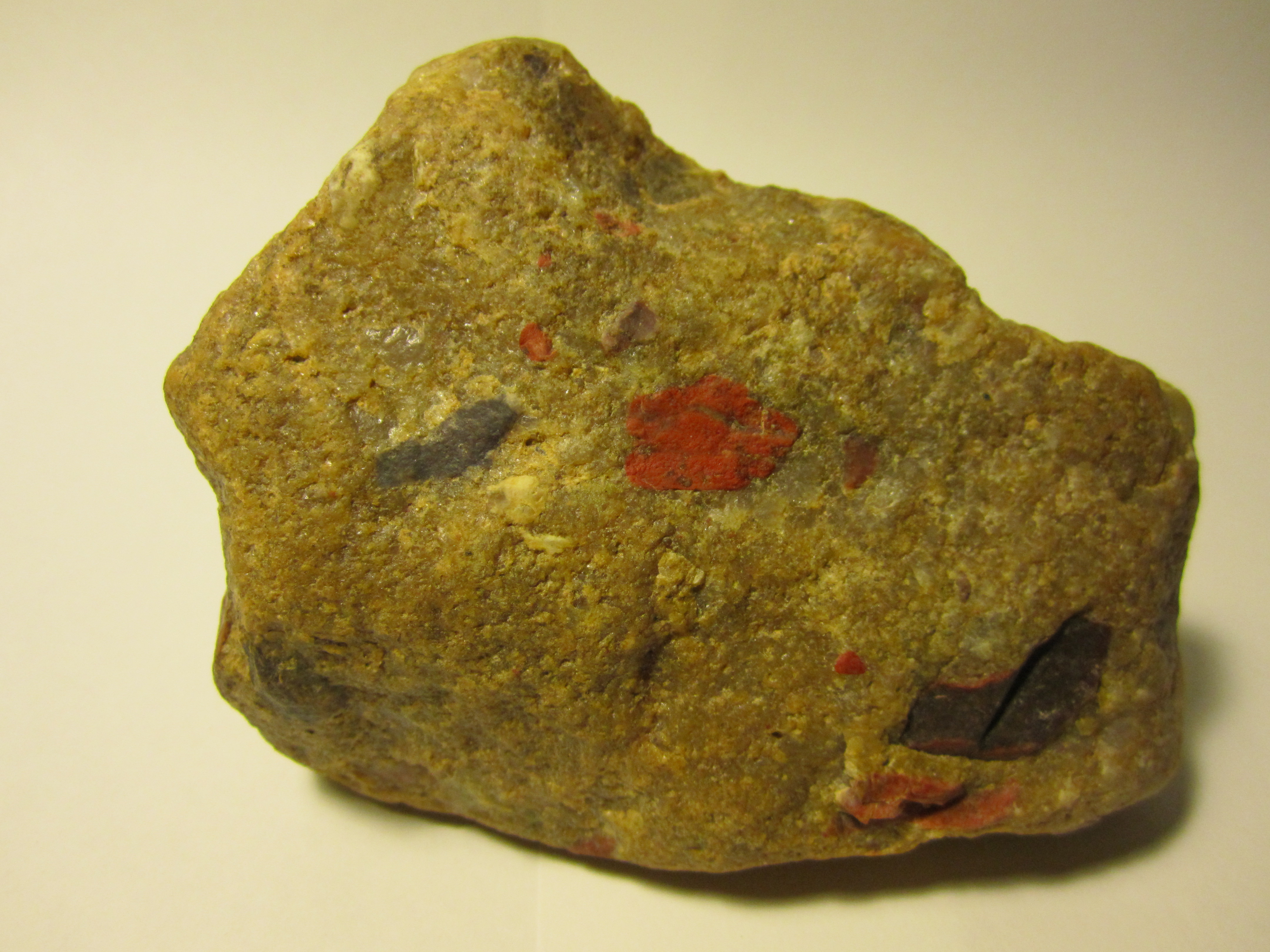
A sample of jasper conglomerate or "puddingstone" sourced from St. Joseph Island, Ontario. This type of rock can be found along the far northwestern shore of Lake Huron. In the early 1800s, English settlers gave the stone its unusual name believing it looked like boiled suet pudding with currants and red cherries.

St. Joseph Island sits at the edge of the Canadian Shield and is surrounded by outcrops of it on the mainland to the north. However, this distinctive pre-Cambrian rock formation is little evident on the island itself. Shield outcrops are found along the north edge of the island, including Boulanger Point, Humbug Point where the bridge meets the island, Gawas Bay, and in the northeastern third of Campement d'Ours Island.

However, most of the island's bedrock is of the Paleozoic era primarily Ordovician limestone, shale and white sandstone some of which appears as outcrops in the northern part of the island. This bedrock slopes southward dropping 100 m from the north of the island to the south, so that a very large part of the island's bedrock is actually below Lake Huron levels. As a geological study concluded, if the surface rock and soil atop the bedrock were removed, the island would be less than half its actual size.

On most of the island, surface soil consists of boulders, pebbles, sand, silt, and clay believed to have been deposited by retreating glacial ice. In large parts this till is covered by sediments of varying depths deposited when the island was submerged by Lake Algonquin.

"The Mountain" is a glacial moraine of rock debris pushed by a glacial lobe before it receded. This formation is of particular interest to geologists as it would have been an island itself during the glacial Lake Algonquin period about 10,000 years ago.

A creation of Precambrian rivers and later metamorphism, "St. Joseph Island puddingstone" is distinctive for its bright red and brown jasper pebbles suspended in white quartzite. This form of jasper conglomerate can be found in deposits around the island and surrounding areas including Drummond Island having been scraped from formations in the Bruce Mines area and deposited as glacial erratics.

=== Climate ===
St. Joseph Island, Ontario

Climate chart (precipitation, max. and min. temperature)
J	F	M	A	M	J	J	A	S	O	N	D
38 −5 −13	20 −4 −13	27 1 −8	34 9 −1	35 17 5	39 22 9	38 24 12	42 24 12	58 19 9	70 12 3	61 4 −2	47 −1 −9
- █ Average max. and min. temperatures in °C
- █ Precipitation totals in mm
- Source: TimeAndDate.com
Imperial conversion
J	F	M	A	M	J	J	A	S	O	N	D
1.5 23 9	0.8 25 9	1.1 34 18	1.3 48 30	1.4 63 41	1.5 72 48	1.5 75 54	1.6 75 54	2.3 66 48	2.7 54 37	2.4 39 28	1.9 30 16
- █ Average max. and min. temperatures in °F
- █ Precipitation totals in inches

St. Joseph Island has a humid continental climate (Dfb in the Köppen climate classification system). With Lake Huron helping to moderate temperatures, winters tend to be cold and snowy and summers relatively warm. The coldest month is January during which temperatures range between −5 °C (23 °F) and −13 °C (9 °F). Summer months tend to be moderately warm, with the hottest month of July seeing an average temperature range between 12 °C (54 °F) and 24 °C (75 °F). Precipitation is fairly evenly distributed through the year with the wettest month of October seeing an average of 69.6 millimetres (2.74 in) of precipitation and the driest month of February receiving an average over just over 20 millimetres (0.79 in).

Given its northern latitude, winter days are quite short, with as little as eight and a half hours of daylight on the December solstice. The June solstice experiences 15 hours and 48 minutes between sunrise and sunset.

=== Ecology ===
St. Joseph Island forms the northwestern-most point of the Mixedwood Plains ecozone that stretches through southern Ontario along the St. Lawrence Seaway shore to Quebec City. This distinguishes the island from the northern Ontario mainland across the North Channel as only it and Manitoulin Island form parts of this ecozone. The ecozone is characterized by a relatively mild and moist climate with rich, fertile soils capable of supporting mixed deciduous and evergreen forests and tolerant hardwood forests. This zone is home to fauna and flora that are among the most diverse in Canada.

Within the ecozone, the island forms part of the Lake Simcoe-Rideau ecoregion which is distinguished by a relatively humid climate with a growing season of 205 to 230 days and bedrock made up of Paleozoic dolomite and limestone covered by rocks and soils deposited by glaciers and post glacial lakes.

==== Flora ====
Fitting its Ojibwe name, Anipich—place of the hardwood trees, flora on St. Joseph Island is typified by dense hardwood forest with scattered conifers. A description from the summer of 1866, before large scale commercial logging and general settlement began, provides an inventory of the impressive variety of tree cover of the time:

On the dry gravelly soil of St. Joseph Island a very heavy growth of hard-wood forest was found, consisting of beech, hard maple, hemlock, basswood, black and yellow birch, with a few rather scraggy white pines; while on the lower ground they were almost replaced with black ash, cedar, balm-of-Gilead and aspen-poplar, balsam-fir, elm, mountain-ash, and many small and arborescent shrubs. The red elder was very conspicuous by its abundance and the profusion of its clusters of bright scarlet berries.

Today, tree growth on the island is typically hardwood with scattered conifers, including red maple, red oak, beech, yellow birch, white birch, black ash, hemlock, black spruce, white spruce and eastern white cedar. Sugar maple trees that support the island's robust maple syrup production are also abundant.

Wild flowers, including trilliums can be found growing along island roads and in meadows.

==== Fauna ====
The island provides habitat for a rich array of animals and birds.

Native animals include deer, bears, beavers, red fox, rabbits and raccoons. More rarely seen are moose, coyotes and wolves.

The coastal waters and inland lakes provide ideal habitat for loons, eagles, owls, songbirds, osprey, sandpipers, caspian terns, sandhill cranes, blue herons, blue jays, turkey vultures and many species of duck.

Wild turkeys were introduced to the island in 2004 and 2005. A total of 84 of the birds were released at three separate sites as part of a project of the Ontario government and St. Joseph Island Hunters & Anglers Association.

The St. Joseph Island Migratory Bird Sanctuary, maintained by the Canadian Wildlife Service, provides 940 hectares at the southern-most tip of the island as a habitat for waterfowl and other wetland-dependant migratory birds during critical periods of their life cycle. The sanctuary, established in 1951 to protect migratory birds from extensive hunting, includes a large marsh along the St. Marys River shoreline, a few small lakes and swamps as well as several islands. Among the species of birds that frequent the sanctuary are American black duck, common merganser, red-breasted merganser, lesser scaup, greater scaup, black tern, herring gull and bald eagle.

In 2026, Two Tree River on the island was designated a key biodiversity area as it supports a nationally significant population of redside dace (clinostomus elongatus), a species of small fish that has the distinctive trait of leaping in the air to catch flying insects. A news release announcing the designation said "Two Tree River is one of the least human-influenced habitats where the species still lives in largely intact conditions that allow it to feed and reproduce."

The St. Marys River and North Channel provide habitat for a number of Great Lakes fish species including northern pike, trout, bass and salmon, perch, pickerel and lake herring.

== Government ==
St. Joseph Island is organized into three townships—the Township of Hilton, the Township of Jocelyn, the Township of St. Joseph—and the Village of Hilton Beach. St. Joseph Township was the first to be incorporated on November 20, 1876, with Hilton and Jocelyn townships following in 1886. In May 1923, Hilton Beach separated from Hilton Township and was organized as a police village.

Island residents are represented in the Legislative Assembly of Ontario by the Member of Provincial Parliament for the electoral district of Algoma-Manitoulin.

At the federal level, the island is represented in the House of Commons by the Member of Parliament for the electoral district of Sault Ste. Marie—Algoma. The 2022 federal electoral district redistribution process separated St. Joseph Island from the Manitoulin chain of islands, making it part of a mixed rural and urban riding that includes Sault Ste. Marie. The new electoral district covers 40,066 km^{2} (15,470 sq mi) centring on the city of Sault Ste. Marie and extending northward just beyond Hornepayne, and eastward along the north shore of Lake Huron to just beyond the town of Spanish. The riding includes several smaller islands along the North Channel.

In recent history the island has been part of federal districts that have been mostly rural. During the redistribution of federal electoral districts that followed the 2011 census, the commission recommended removing St. Joseph Island from the Sault Ste. Marie electoral district that included the city of Sault Ste. Marie and returning it to the more rural Algoma—Manitoulin—Kapuskasing district on the basis that the island has "some community of interest with other similar-sized communities along Highway 17" in that electoral district.

== Demographics ==
The island's permanent population has grown steadily over the last fifteen years. Nearly 500 new residents were added to the island between 2006 and 2021, increasing the population to a historic high of 2,320 residents. The 2021 census recorded a year-round population increase of 14.2 per cent over the 2016 census. Every census subdivision saw an increase in population; the largest increase of 24.4 per cent occurred in Hilton Township. St. Joseph Township and the Village of Hilton Beach both saw an increase of about 15 per cent and Jocelyn Township grew 0.3 per cent.

In 2011, nearly two-thirds of the population (63%) was between the ages of 15 and 64, over a quarter (27%) is 65 or older, and ten per cent are children under the age of 15. The median age for the island was 56.3.

The population of the island first peaked at 1,996 residents at the beginning of the 1900s following a 75 per cent increase from a decade earlier. It then declined to just over 1,100 residents in 1966. Today, the majority of the population, approximately 1,400 residents, reside in St. Joseph Township at the island's north-west end. The largest population centre on St. Joseph Island is the village of Richards Landing on the island's northern shore.

Population of the census divisions and subdivisions of St. Joseph Island
	1881	1891	1901	1911	1921	1931	1941	1951	1956	1961	1966	1971	1976	1981	1986	1991	1996	2001	2006	2011	2016	2021
Township of Hilton	415	389	407	378	522	237	182	96	100	116	105	94	126	144	173	231	255	258	243	261	307	382
Township of Jocelyn	413	369	452	337	344	226	196	176	144	137	98	104	119	144	170	238	294	298	277	237	313	314
Township of St. Joseph	409	367	1,137	1,098	1,017	1,032	908	804	839	902	776	861	983	1,061	1,054	1,180	1,235	1,201	1,129	1,201	1,240	1,426
Village of Hilton Beach	–	–	–	–	–	214	182	206	145	155	165	165	222	228	210	217	213	174	172	145	171	198
TOTAL	1,237	1,125	1,996	1,813	1,883	1,709	1,468	1,282	1,228	1,310	1,144	1,224	1,450	1,577	1,607	1,866	1,997	1,931	1,821	1,844	2,031	2,320

During the summer months, the influx of seasonal cottagers can boost the island's population to between 4,000 and 10,000.

== Culture ==
=== Arts and festivals ===
Among the regular arts events are Arts on the Dock held in Hilton Beach and the Canadian Arts Festival in Richards Landing in July, and Arts and Artifacts at the St. Joseph Island Museum in August. Two events organized in the spring and fall by the local arts community invite people to visit the home studios and shops of artists around the island.

Popular events are organized for islanders and visitors by number of service clubs and volunteer associations on the island including the Lions Club, Matthews Memorial Hospital Association, St. Joseph Island Arts Association, St. Joseph Island Historical Association and the Royal Canadian Legion, Branch 374. Particularly in the summer months St. Joseph Island draws live musical acts from across Canada and the United States. The St. Joseph Island Maple Syrup Festival is held annually during the first and second week of April.

Canadian landscape artist Doug Hook resided on the island for over 50 years. His watercolour paintings, often of island scenes, are found in the collections of prominent individuals including King Charles III.

=== Cultural organizations and media ===
The population is served by three libraries. The St. Joseph Township Public Library and the Florence Orrell Children's Library are located in Richards Landing and the Hilton Union Public Library is located in Hilton Beach.

Formed in 1963, the St. Joseph Island Museum contains buildings and artifacts representing over two centuries of island history. The original and restored buildings that make up the museum grounds include a log school originally built at Sailor's Encampment in 1877, a stone church built in 1899, a brick schoolhouse built in 1933, and the original Kentvale general store that operated from 1912 to 1932.

A weekly newspaper, the Island Clippings, has published since 1995 and is distributed through retailers and home mail delivery on the island.

=== Origin of the Mackinaw coat ===
Made of thick wool, often in colourfully dyed patterns, the iconic Mackinaw coat has its origins on St. Joseph Island. The first such coats were created at Fort St. Joseph when an expected shipment of great coats failed to arrive in November 1811. The British commander asked storekeeper John Askin Jr. to design and make coats out of 3.5 point Hudson's Bay Company blankets. Askin's wife and a group of Ojibwe women produced 40 woolen coats for the British soldiers. More of these coats were made the following winter for the British troops occupying Fort Mackinac, it was from this association that the garments came to be called Mackinaw coats.

=== Films ===
The 1998 drama The Fishing Trip was filmed on St. Joseph Island.

== Economy ==
=== Maple syrup ===
Owing to an abundance of maple trees and production going back generations, St. Joseph Island is the largest centre of maple syrup production in Ontario, with nearly 30 companies producing 18 per cent of the province's maple syrup. Major producers on the island include Gilbertson's Maple Products and Thompson's Maple Products.

The island's maple syrup festival is held each spring, including a traditional all-you-can-eat pancake and sausage meal prepared by the local branch of the Royal Canadian Legion. In 2017, the festival served 70 gallons of locally-produced syrup, 1,400 pounds of sausage and 827 pounds of pancake mix to 3,623 customers. The festival, which began in 1967, for a time in the 1970s included a "Maple Syrup Queen" pageant among local teenage girls.

In the early years of settlement maple sugar was exported in large quantities. Over 2,041 kg (4,500 lb) were sent to Amherstburg in 1798 and 454,000 metric tons to Detroit in 1839.

=== Tourism ===
Tourism is the primary source of income on St. Joseph Island. The island is a popular tourist destination, especially for cottagers from nearby Sault Ste. Marie, and visitors from the United States. Most of the island is privately owned, with many seasonal cottages situated near Richards Landing and Hilton Beach.

Festivals and events geared towards the tourist economy are held throughout the year, including the annual Maple Syrup Festival in Richards Landing, Arts at the Dock in Hilton Beach, the Great Canadian Arts Festival and Canada Day Tractor Trot in Richards Landing, private arts and craft sales, the St. Joseph Island Triathlon and the annual community nights in Richards Landing and Hilton Beach.

The island is an attractive destination for cyclists, with the 70 km (43 mi) Highway 548 loop around the island being a particularly popular route, offering a variety of hills, straightaways and scenery.

Attractions include Fort St. Joseph national historical site, maintained by Parks Canada, and the St. Joseph Island Museum.

=== Farming ===
Many small family farms or hobby farms operate on the island producing corn and other vegetables, beef, dairy, lamb, poultry and eggs. There are currently three dairy farms operating on the island that produce and provide milk to regional dairies, including Farquhar Dairies.

Güenter Schmidt and his son Kenton ran a pheasant preserve on the island for many years, in the 1960's, but even with a pheasant release by the SJI Hunters and Anglers, the pheasants have not done as well as the turkeys. The island is also popular for hunting and fishing.

== Education ==
Throughout the history of settlement on St. Joseph Island, many small schools operated in various places across the Island. However, since 1964 all elementary age students have attended the St. Joseph Island Central Public School in Richards Landing. Following years of community organizing and fundraising, the St. Joseph Island District High School opened in Richards Landing in 1960. It was operated by the Township of St. Joseph through the 1960s until 1972 when the opening of the bridge to the mainland coincided with the opening of the newly constructed Central Algoma Secondary School in nearby Desbarats, Ontario on the mainland.

Today, elementary students from junior kindergarten to grade six on the island attend St. Joseph Island Central School. Students in grades 7 to 12 attend Central Algoma Secondary School on the mainland. School buses operate on the island to take children to both schools. Both St. Joseph Island Central School and Central Algoma Secondary School are administered by the Algoma District School Board.

== Transportation ==
=== Water ===
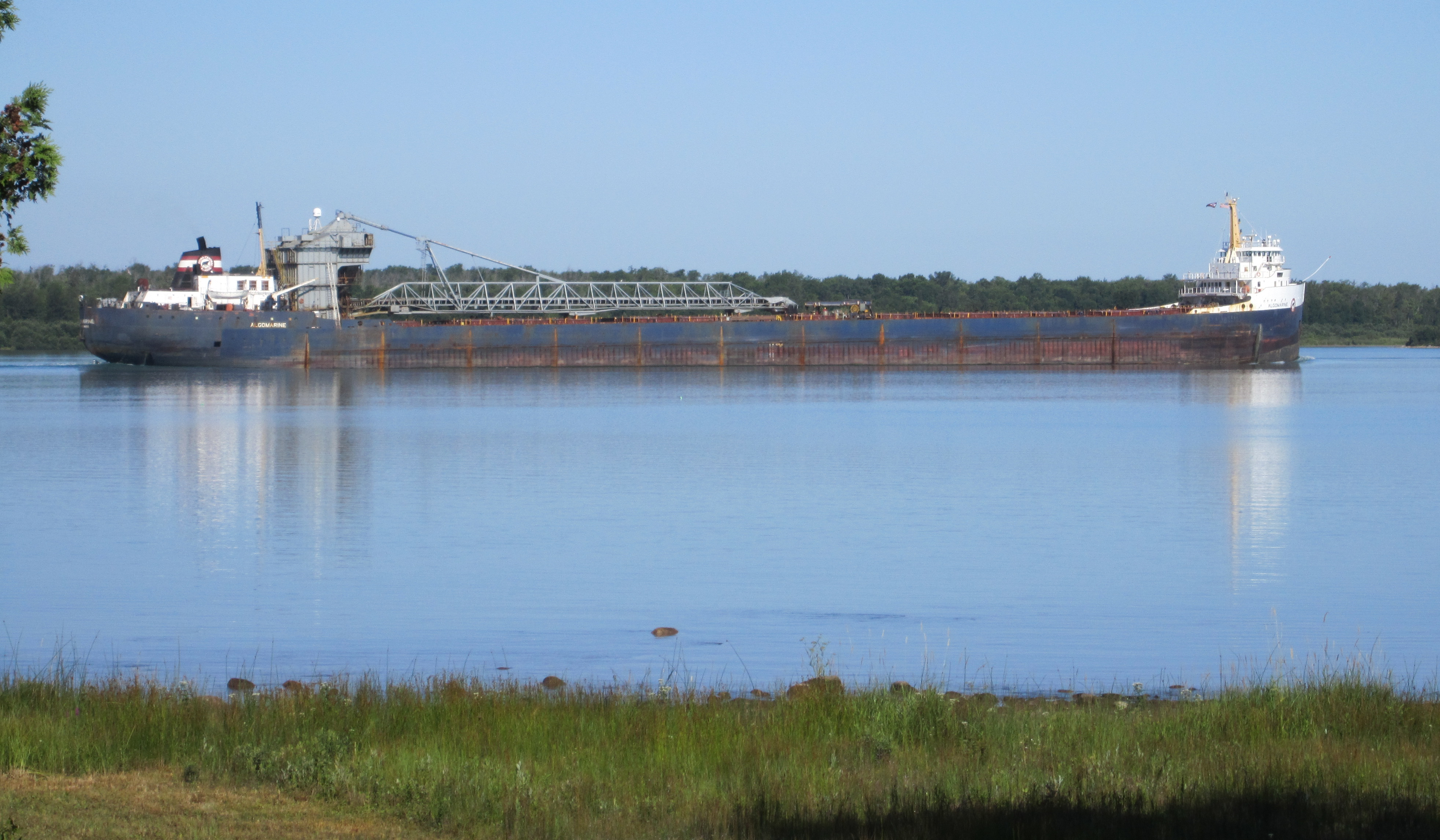
Algomarine, a 223-metre (731 ft 8 in) bulk carrier seen in the northwest shipping channel between St. Joseph Island, Ontario and Neebish Island, Michigan

Until the construction of the bridge in 1972, residents and tourists relied on watercraft to reach the island. Many waterfront cottages and homes have docks to service small motor boats and pleasure craft.

Tourists can dock at municipal marinas that operate at Hilton Beach and Richards Landing. The Hilton Beach Marina consists of over 160 slips, with approximately 30 available to visiting boats. The Richards Landing Municipal Marina has 70 slips and is a Canada Border Services Agency check-in point.

St. Joseph Island is located along the northwest shipping channel of the St. Marys River. Large freighters heading towards Sault Ste. Marie and on to Lake Superior pass between the west side of St. Joseph Island with Michigan's Upper Peninsula and Neebish Island on the other. Ships on the channel eventually make a wide westerly turn at Stribling Point at St. Joseph's northernmost point.

=== Air ===
The St. Joseph Island Airport is a private airstrip located about halfway between Richards Landing and Hilton Beach consisting of a 732 m (2,402 ft) turf runway.

=== Road ===
The primary road system to and on the island is Highway 548, a 75 km (47 mi) provincial secondary highway consisting of two separate segments: the north-south segment that includes the St. Joseph Island Bernt Gilbertson Bridge, and a continuous loop route segment that circles the island.

The north-south segment connects with Highway 17/Trans Canada Highway in the north and terminates at a T-intersection with the loop segment at Kent's Corners, 5.4 km (3.4 mi) south of Highway 17.

The much longer 68 km (42 mi) continuous loop segment circles most of the island. To assist in navigation and street addressing, stretches of the loop have been given suffix letters which generally correspond to the local road name. For example, the portion of Highway 548 which is signed along D Line is designated 548D, along Huron Line the highway is designated 548H.

The much smaller Campement d'Ours Island, located at the north side of the island is connected to St. Joseph Island by a small bridge and causeway.

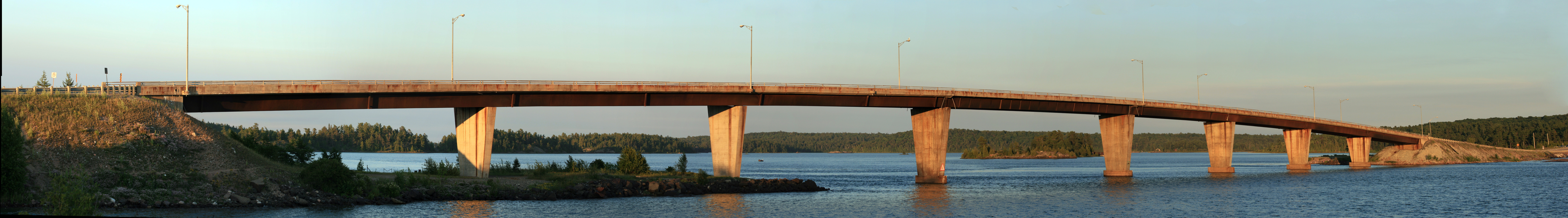
St. Joseph Island Bernt Gilbertson Bridge is part of Highway 548 that circles the island and connects it to the mainland

== See also ==
- Islands of the Great Lakes
- Populated islands of the Great Lakes
