= Jasper conglomerate =

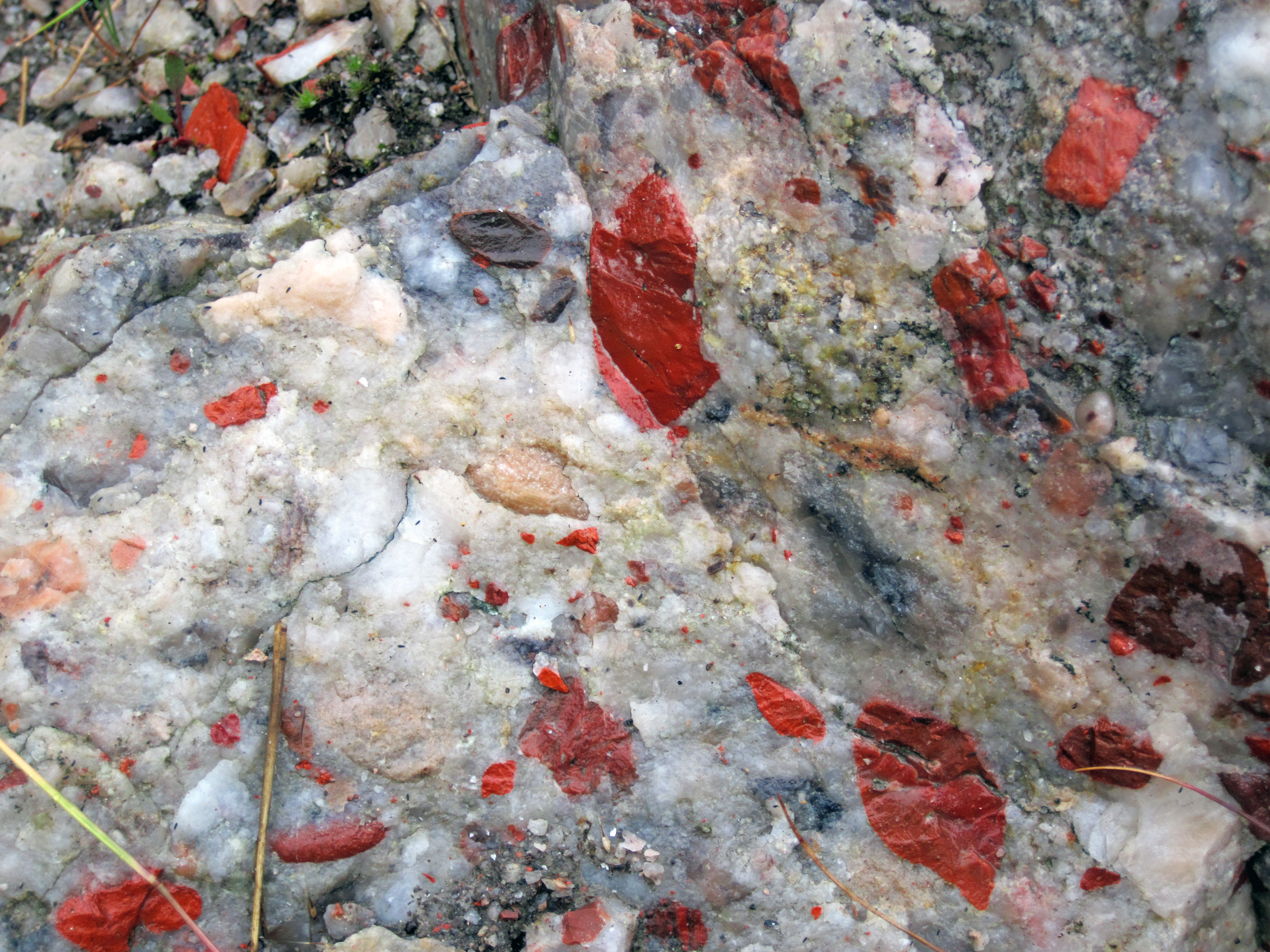
Jasper-quartz pebble conglomerate found near Bruce Mines, Ontario, Canada

Jasper conglomerate is an informal term for a very distinctive Paleoproterozoic quartz and jasper pebble conglomerate that occurs within the middle part of the Lorrain Formation of the Cobalt Group of the Huronian Supergroup. It is also known by other names including pebble jasper conglomerate, St. Joseph Island puddingstone, Drummond Island puddingstone, Michigan puddingstone. The jasper conglomerate occurs on St. Joseph Island and the St. Mary's River area north and northwest of the Bruce Mines of Northern Ontario, about 65 kilometres (40 mi) east of Sault Ste. Marie. This conglomerate consisted originally of gravelly sands and sandy gravels composed of subrounded pebbles of red jasper, white quartzite, semi-transparent quartz, and black chert, with coarse-grained sand matrix. Typically it contains between about 30% to as much as 90% pebbles. It has been cemented and partially metamorphosed into a quartzitic conglomerate. The beds of jasper conglomerates fill erosional troughs and channels of what are interpreted to be either alluvial fan or braided river deposits of the Lorrain Formation. These deposits are interpreted to represent nonglacial deposits that immediately postdate the Makganyene glaciation.

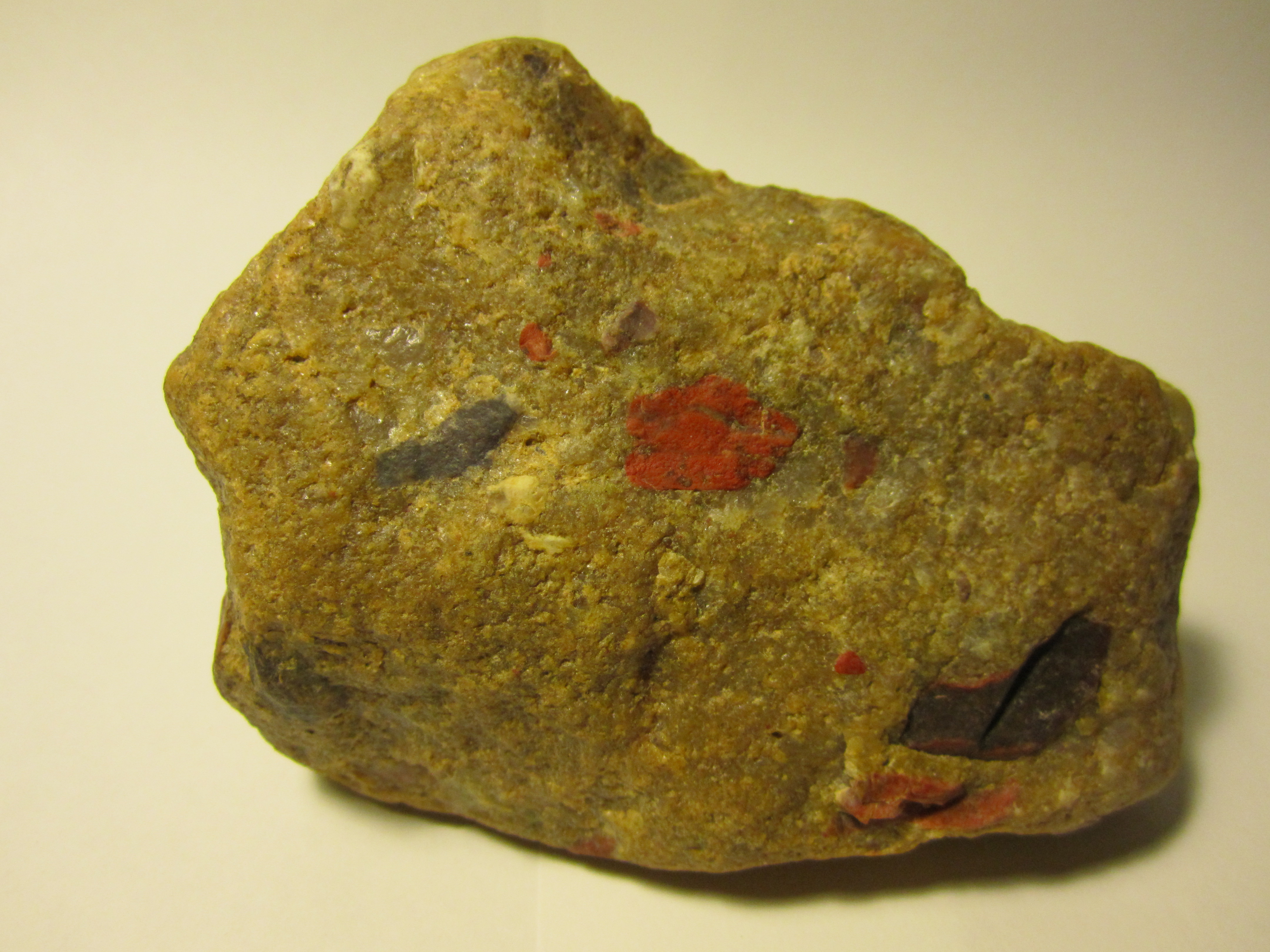
A sample of jasper conglomerate rock from St. Joseph Island, Ontario.

Because of its distinctive nature, pebble- to boulder-size fragments of jasper conglomerate can be recognized as glacial erratics in Pleistocene glacial tills and drift within large parts of the glaciated Midwestern United States. Fragments of jasper conglomerate were eroded by continental ice sheets from Northern Ontario and spread across all of Michigan and as far south as Ohio and Kentucky during repeated glacial advances and retreats. For example, pebble to boulder-size fragments of jasper conglomerate are quite common on Drummond Island, Michigan where it is called Drummond Island puddingstone.

== See also ==
- Puddingstone (rock)
- Hertfordshire puddingstone
- Roxbury puddingstone
