= Hilton Beach =

- Village (single-tier)
- Village of Hilton Beach
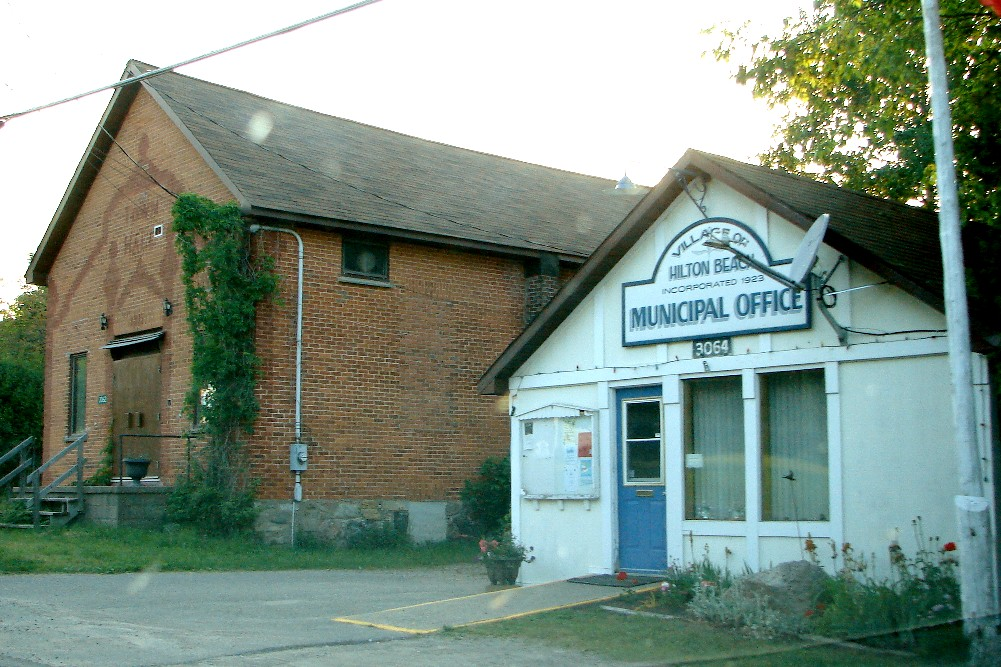
- Old town hall and previous municipal office.

- Location within Ontario
- Coordinates: 46°15′N 83°53′W
- Country: Canada
- Province: Ontario
- District: Algoma
- Settled: 1850s
- Incorporated: 1923

Government
  - Type: Village
  - Mayor: Robert Hope
  - Governing Body: Hilton Beach Village Council
  - MP: Terry Sheehan (Liberal)
  - MPP: Bill Rosenberg (PC)

Area
  - Land: 2.52 km^{2} (0.97 sq mi)

Population (2021)
  - Total: 198
  - Density: 78.6/km^{2} (204/sq mi)
- Time zone: UTC-5 (EST)
  - Summer (DST): UTC-4 (EDT)
- Postal code: P0R 1G0
- Area code(s): 705
- Website: hiltonbeach.com

Hilton Beach is a village located in Algoma District, Ontario, Canada. It is located on the northeastern shore of St. Joseph Island in the North Channel of Lake Huron, approximately 60 kilometres from Sault Ste. Marie. The village had a population of 198 (up from 171 in 2016) and a land area of 2.52 km² per the 2021 Canadian census.

== History ==
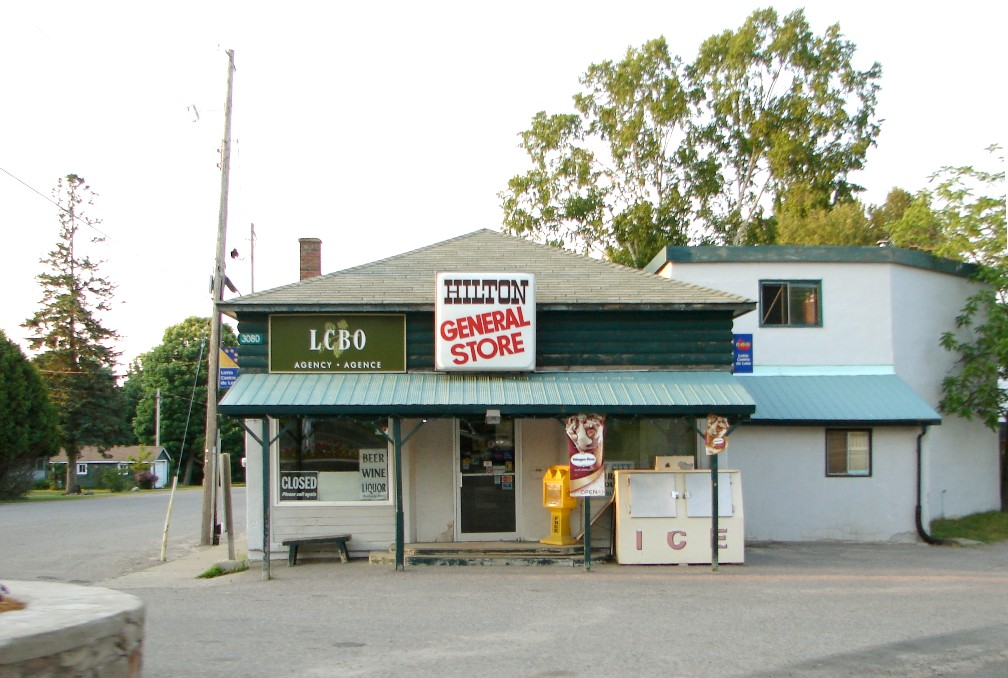
General store

The area which is now known as Hilton Beach had its origins in the 1850s when a wharf was first built. By the 1860s, fourteen families had settled in the area, including the Trainors, Rousseaus, Gordons, Bishops and Desjardins.

John Marks came to St. Joseph Island in the 1860s to settle at Sailors Encampment. He moved to the area that would become Hilton Beach in 1872. Marks first opened a store and a wood dock followed by a post office six years later under the name of Marksville. A school was established in 1877, and in 1881 St. John's Anglican Church was erected.

J. Archibald built a hotel in 1879, originally called The Ottawa House. It was moved to its current site in 1890. Other businesses included Bowker's General Store, Duncan's General Store, R. Chester's shoemaker shop, and the sawmill operated by Dean and Davis. J.C. Cooper was a wagon maker, and T. Steinburg was the blacksmith, who operated out of the white concrete building still standing today on Hilton Road.

A.G. Duncan, D. McPhail and John Marks were justices. The village was called Marksville until June 1, 1921, when it was changed to Hilton Beach. Two years later the village split off from Hilton Township and became a separate village municipality.

Many of the historical buildings in Hilton Beach are still being used today. The community hall, renovated in 1989, was originally built in 1896 and used as a schoolhouse until the 1960s. The old town hall, built in 1916, was used as a violin workshop for several years and is now for sale. The Hilton Beach General Store is over 100 years old and is still open for business.

The Hilton Beach jail is unusual in that it never actually housed an inmate. The small building, barely measuring 20' by 20', in fact housed the Hilton Beach Library for several years in the 1920s. The library is now housed in another historical building on Marks Street.

== Demographics ==
In the 2021 Census of Population conducted by Statistics Canada, Hilton Beach had a population of 198 living in 98 of its 134 total private dwellings, a change of 15.8% from its 2016 population of 171. With a land area of 2.52 km^{2} (0.97 sq mi), it had a population density of 78.6/km^{2} (203.5/sq mi) in 2021.

Canada census – Hilton Beach community profile

	2021	2016	2011
Population	198 (+15.8% from 2016)	171 (+17.9% from 2011)	145 (-15.7% from 2006)
Land area	2.52 km^{2} (0.97 sq mi)	2.62 km^{2} (1.01 sq mi)	2.46 km^{2} (0.95 sq mi)
Population density	78.6/km^{2} (204/sq mi)	65.2/km^{2} (169/sq mi)	59.0/km^{2} (153/sq mi)
Median age	56.8 (M: 53.6, F: 57.6)	53.9 (M: 55.2, F: 53.8)
Private dwellings	134 (total) 98 (occupied)	128 (total)	124 (total)
Median household income		$41,984

References: 2021 2016 2011

Historical census populations – Hilton Beach

Year	Pop.	±%
1931	214	—
1941	182	−15.0%
1951	206	+13.2%
1956	145	−29.6%
1961	155	+6.9%
1966	165	+6.5%

Year	Pop.	±%
1971	165	+0.0%
1976	222	+34.5%
1981	228	+2.7%
1986	210	−7.9%
1991	217	+3.3%
1996	213	−1.8%

Year	Pop.	±%
2001	174	−18.3%
2006	172	−1.1%
2011	145	−15.7%
2016	171	+17.9%
2021	198	+15.8%

Source: Statistics Canada

== Tourism ==
Hilton Beach has been a popular tourist destination since the early 1900s. Several families from Michigan, Ohio, California, Ontario, Washington, Massachusetts and Florida have been spending their summers in and around Hilton Beach since the 1910s.

The MS Norgoma, a package freighter and passenger ferry, called on Hilton Beach on Wednesdays until 1963.

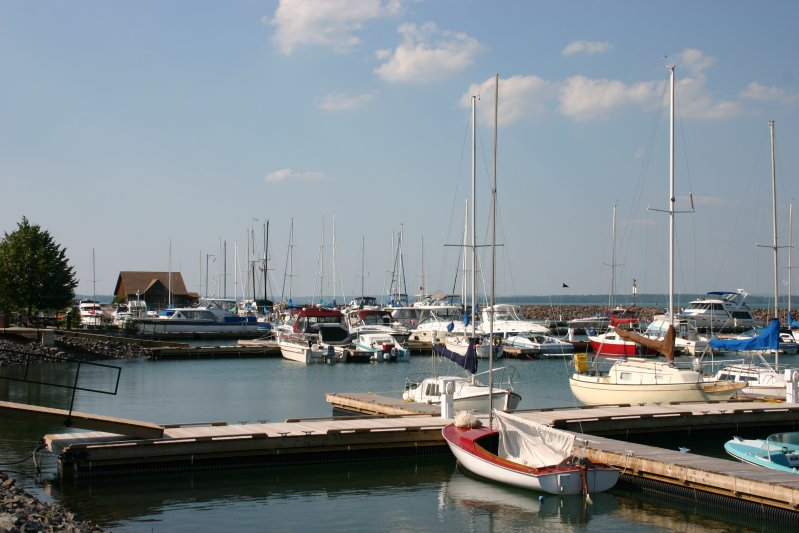
Hilton Beach Marina

Today, the village attracts visitors primarily from Sault Ste. Marie and southern Ontario, as well as Michigan.

The village's location at Lake Huron makes it a very popular boating destination. The Hilton Beach Marina has over 180 slips (~1 per capita in the town) and is very popular in the summer. The sailing in the St. Joseph Channel is the main attraction for many seasonal residents and tourists. The marina operates from May through to October.

The Hilton Beach Tourist Park, a tent and trailer park, was built in the 1950s. The Park welcomes back dozens of seasonal residents every summer and is a community unto itself during peak season.

== Government ==
The mayor of the village is Mike Garside, and its councillors are John Wells, Julie C. Moore, John Davison and Shirley Bailey Meeks. The village clerk is Peggy Cramp.
