= St. Joseph, Ontario =

St. Joseph
- Township (single-tier)
- Township of St. Joseph
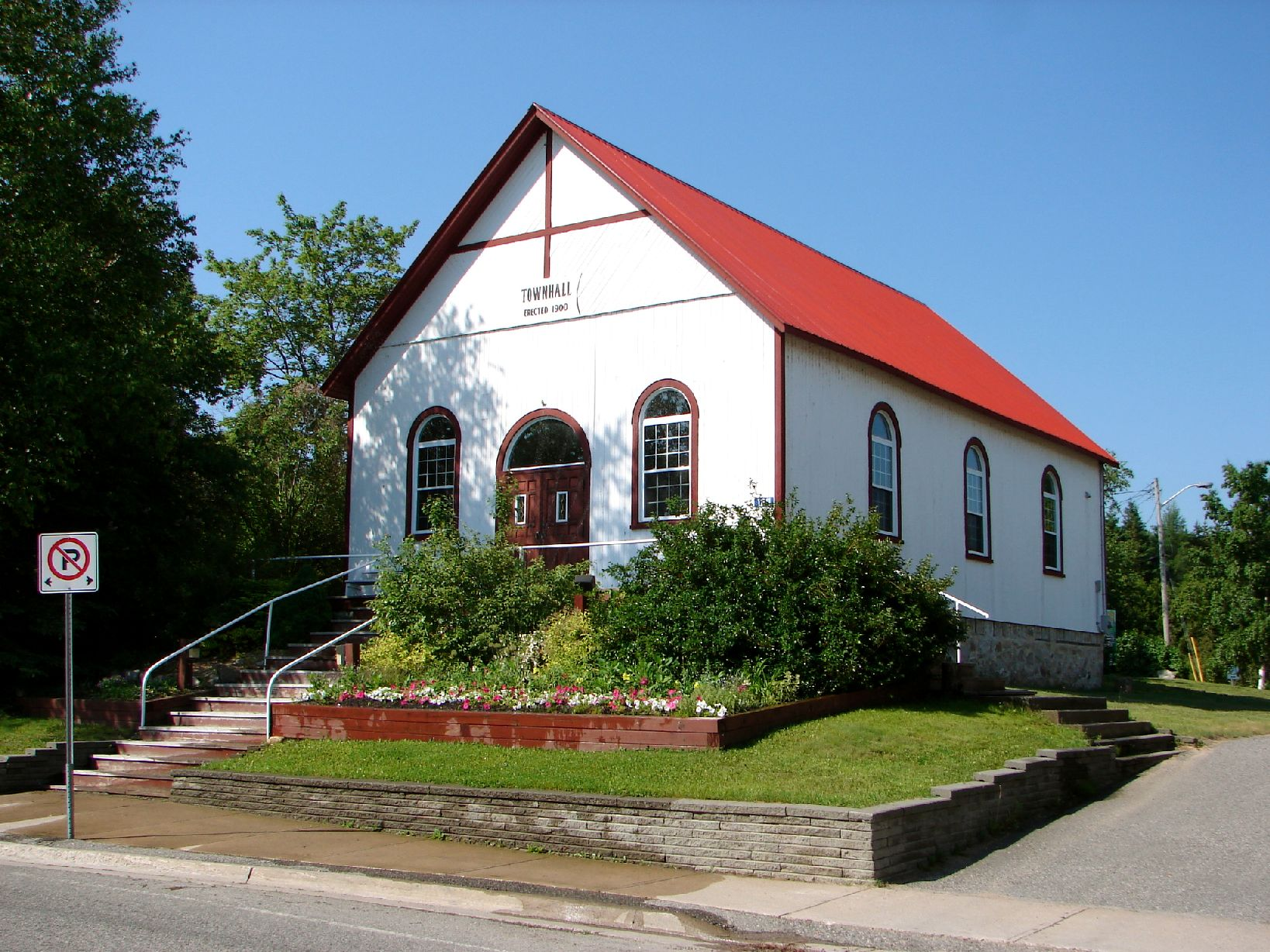
- Town hall in Richards Landing

- Location within Ontario
- Coordinates: 46°16′N 84°00′W
- Country: Canada
- Province: Ontario
- District: Algoma
- Settled: 1860s
- Incorporated: 1876

Government
  - Type: Township
  - Mayor: Joseph (Jody) Wildman
  - Governing Body: St. Joseph Township Council
  - MP: Terry Sheehan (Liberal)
  - MPP: Bill Rosenberg (PC)

Area
  - Land: 127.65 km^{2} (49.29 sq mi)

Population (2021)
  - Total: 1,426
  - Density: 11.2/km^{2} (29/sq mi)
- Time zone: UTC-5 (EST)
  - Summer (DST): UTC-4 (EDT)
- Postal code: P0R 1G0
- Area codes: 705, 249
- Website: www.stjosephtownship.com

St. Joseph is a township in the Canadian province of Ontario, the largest of four municipalities on St. Joseph Island. It had a population of 1,426 in the 2021 Canadian census.

== Communities ==
The township's main population centre is Richards Landing (46°17′25″N 84°02′05″W). It also includes the smaller communities of Harmony (46°13′33″N 84°02′41″W) and Sailors Encampment (46°15′42″N 84°05′54″W), as well as Kentvale (46°12′30″N 84°02′05″W) on the boundary with Jocelyn Township.

=== Richards Landing ===
The hamlet of Richards Landing has a view of the Highway 548 bridge at the pier on the northern tip of town. Highway 548 leads through the centre of the town and is its main thoroughfare. "The Landing" is St. Joseph Island's business centre, offering a grocery store, liquor/beer store, gift shops and galleries, restaurants, accommodation, marina/boat re-fuelling, 24-hour Emergency Department/hospital, medical centre, pharmacy and physiotherapy (physical therapy) clinic, bank, parks, public swimming, beach and tennis courts, variety store and movie rentals.

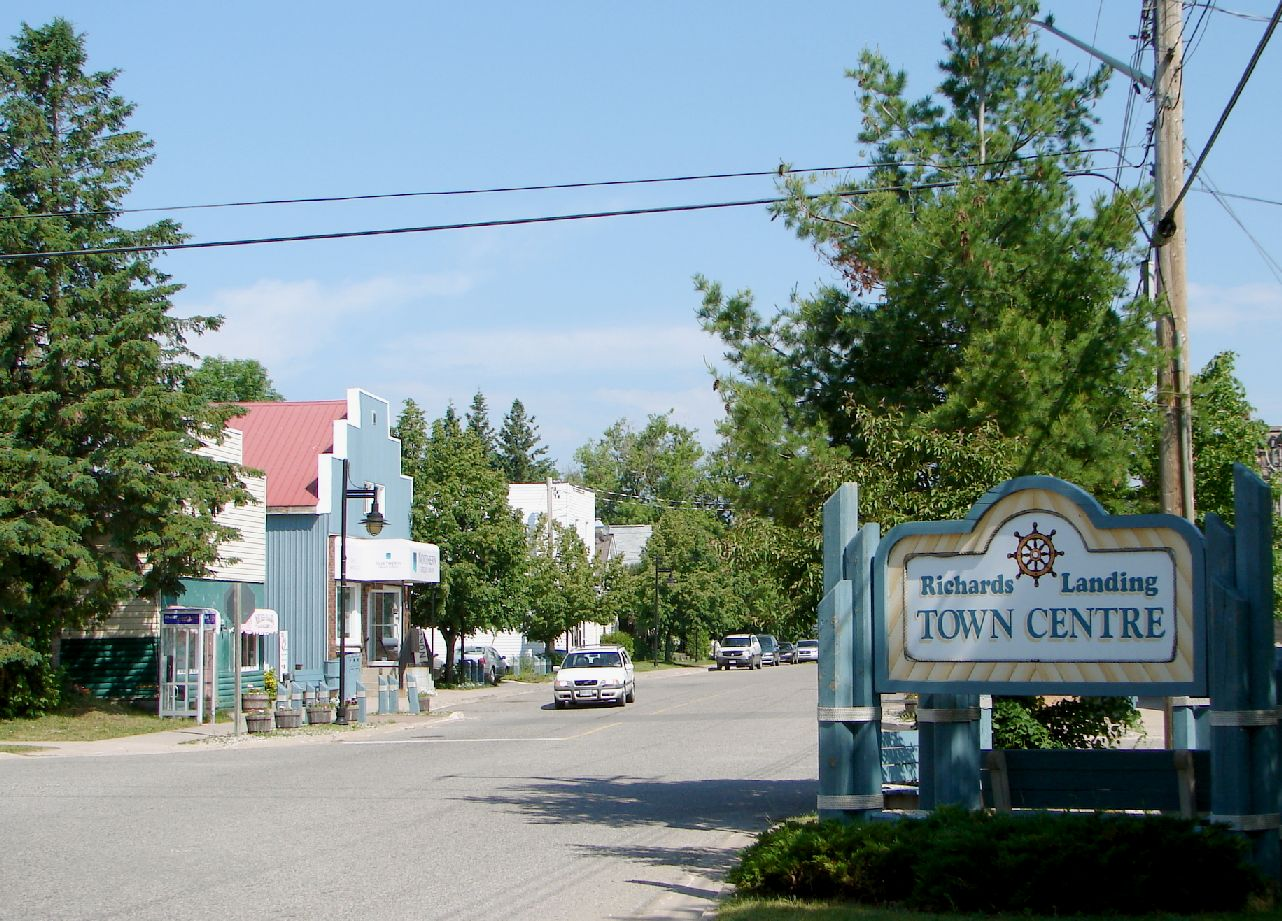
Main street of Richards Landing

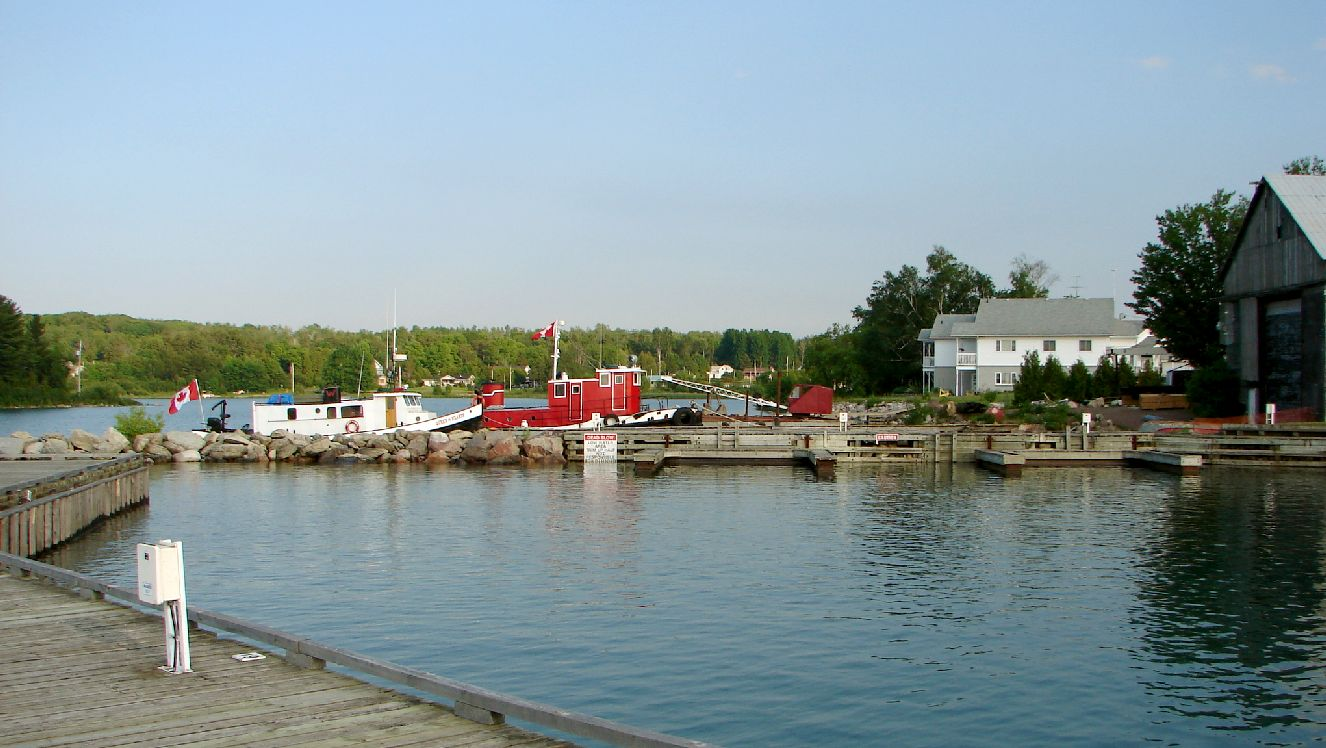
Marina of Richards Landing

== Demographics ==
In the 2021 Census of Population conducted by Statistics Canada, St. Joseph had a population of 1,426 living in 612 of its 909 total private dwellings, a change of 15% from its 2016 population of 1,240. With a land area of 127.65 km^{2} (49.29 sq mi), it had a population density of 11.2/km^{2} (28.9/sq mi) in 2021.

Canada census – St. Joseph, Ontario community profile

| | 2021 | 2016 | 2011 |
| Population | 1,426 (+15.0% from 2016) | 1,240 (3.2% from 2011) | 1201 (6.4% from 2006) |
| Land area | 127.65 km^{2} (49.29 sq mi) | 129.12 km^{2} (49.85 sq mi) | 129.36 km^{2} (49.95 sq mi) |
| Population density | 11.2/km^{2} (29/sq mi) | 9.6/km^{2} (25/sq mi) | 9.3/km^{2} (24/sq mi) |
| Median age | 57.2 (M: 57.2, F: 56.8) | 50.3 (M: 51.0, F: 49.7) |
| Private dwellings | 909 (total) 612 (occupied) | 853 (total) | 893 (total) |
| Median household income | $83,000 |

References: 2021 2016 2011

Historical census populations – St. Joseph, Ontario

| Year | Pop. | ±% |
|---|---|---|
| 1881 | 409 | — |
| 1891 | 367 | −10.3% |
| 1901 | 1,137 | +209.8% |
| 1911 | 1,098 | −3.4% |
| 1921 | 1,017 | −7.4% |
| 1931 | 1,032 | +1.5% |
| 1941 | 908 | −12.0% |
| 1951 | 804 | −11.5% |

| Year | Pop. | ±% |
|---|---|---|
| 1956 | 839 | +4.4% |
| 1961 | 902 | +7.5% |
| 1966 | 776 | −14.0% |
| 1971 | 861 | +11.0% |
| 1976 | 983 | +14.2% |
| 1981 | 1,061 | +7.9% |
| 1986 | 1,054 | −0.7% |
| 1991 | 1,180 | +12.0% |

| Year | Pop. | ±% |
|---|---|---|
| 1996 | 1,235 | +4.7% |
| 2001 | 1,201 | −2.8% |
| 2006 | 1,129 | −6.0% |
| 2011 | 1,201 | +6.4% |
| 2016 | 1,240 | +3.2% |
| 2021 | 1,426 | +15.0% |

Source: Statistics Canada

== See also ==
- List of townships in Ontario
