= 2022 Algoma District municipal elections =

Elections were held in the organized municipalities in the Algoma District of Ontario on October 24, 2022, in conjunction with municipal elections across the province.

The following are the results of the mayoral races in each municipality and the council races in the City of Sault Ste. Marie.

== Blind River ==
=== Mayor ===
One-term incumbent Sally Hagman has been re-elected as mayor of Blind River by acclamation.

Mayoral Candidate	Vote	%
Sally Hagman (X)	Acclaimed	

== Bruce Mines ==
=== Mayor ===
The results mayor of Bruce Mines were as follows.

Mayoral Candidate	Vote	%
Lori Patteri (X)	131	55.04
Jim McCulloch	107	44.96

== Dubreuilville ==
Beverley Nantel was acclaimed as mayor of Dubreuilville.

=== Mayor ===
Mayoral Candidate	Vote	%
Beverley Nantel (X)	Acclaimed	

== Elliot Lake ==
The following were the results for mayor of Elliot Lake.

=== Mayor ===
Incumbent mayor Dan Marchisella was challenged by city councillor Chris Patrie, accessibility advocate Mike Thomas, and Geraldine Robinson.

Mayoral Candidate	Vote	%
Chris Patrie	1,619	43.90
Dan Marchisella (X)	1,158	31.40
Mike Thomas	538	14.59
Geraldine Robinson	373	10.11

In January 2023, just a few weeks after taking office, Patrie was removed from office in a ruling that he had violated municipal conflict of interest rules by lobbying, in his prior term as a city councillor, to have the city's new recreation centre built near the Oakland Plaza, in which he is a part owner, instead of on the former Algo Centre Mall site. Deputy mayor Andrew Wannan served as acting mayor, while Patrie appealed the ruling; after Patrie lost his appeal, Wannan was elevated to the full mayoralty by the city council in February 2024.

== Hilton ==
=== Reeve ===
Rodney Wood was re-elected as reeve by acclamation.

Reeve Candidate	Vote	%
Rodney Wood (X)	Acclaimed	

== Hilton Beach ==
Incumbent mayor Robert Hope has been acclaimed as mayor of Hilton Beach.

=== Mayor ===
Mayoral Candidate	Vote	%
Robert Hope (X)	Acclaimed	

== Hornepayne ==
Cheryl Fort was re-elected as mayor of Hornepayne by acclamation.

=== Mayor ===
Mayoral Candidate	Vote	%
Cheryl Fort (X)	Acclaimed	

== Huron Shores ==
The following were the results for mayor of Huron Shores.

=== Mayor ===
Mayoral Candidate	Vote	%
Matthew Seabrook	702	85.82
Georges Bilodeau (X)	116	14.18

== Jocelyn ==
The following were the results for reeve of Jocelyn.

=== Reeve ===
Reeve Candidate	Vote	%
Mark Henderson (X)	314	65.42
Brian Dukes	166	34.58

== Johnson ==
Township councillor Reg McKinnon was acclaimed as mayor of Johnson.

=== Mayor ===
Mayoral Candidate	Vote	%
Reginald McKinnon	Acclaimed	

== Laird ==
The following are the results for mayor of Laird.

=== Mayor ===
Mayoral Candidate	Vote	%
Shawn Evoy	359	71.37
Frank Turco	144	28.63

== Macdonald, Meredith and Aberdeen Additional ==
=== Mayor ===
Mayoral Candidate	Vote	%
Lynn Watson (X)	Acclaimed	

== North Shore, The ==
Tony Moor was re-elected as mayor of The North Shore by acclamation.

=== Mayor ===
Mayoral Candidate	Vote	%
Tony Moor (X)	Acclaimed	

== Plummer Additional ==
The following were the results for mayor of Plummer Additional.

=== Mayor ===
Mayoral Candidate	Vote	%
Beth West (X)	106	57.61
William Jordan	78	42.39

== Prince ==
The following were the results for mayor of Prince.

=== Mayor ===
Mayoral Candidate	Vote	%
Enzo Palumbo	290	51.79
Ken Lamming (X)	270	48.21

== Sault Ste. Marie ==
The following are the results for mayor and city council of Sault Ste. Marie.

=== Mayor ===
Incumbent mayor Christian Provenzano did not run for re-election. Running to replace him were city councillors Matthew Shoemaker and Donna Hilsinger, former councillor Ozzie Grandinetti, climate activist Tobin Kern and public relations consultant Robert Peace.

Mayoral Candidate	Vote	%
Matthew Shoemaker	9,626	44.23
Ozzie Grandinetti	5,417	24.89
Donna Hilsinger	4,047	18.60
Robert Peace	2,007	9.22
Tobin Kern	665	3.06

=== Sault Ste. Marie City Council ===
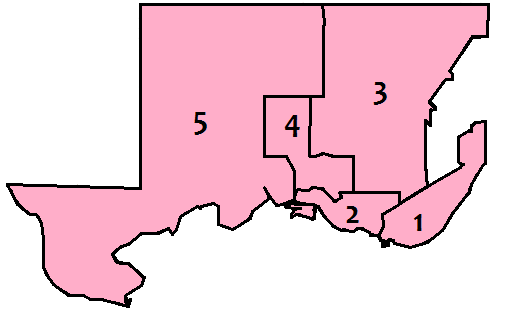
Map of Sault Ste. Marie's five wards

Two elected per ward.

Candidate	Vote	%
Ward 1
Sandra Hollingsworth (X)	3,255	34.70
Sonny Spina	2,900	30.91
Brent Derochie	2,164	23.07
William McPhee	564	6.01
Johnathan Lalonde	498	5.31
Ward 2
Luke Dufour (X)	2,462	36.43
Lisa Vezeau-Allen (X)	2,206	32.64
Dennis Murphy	1,117	16.53
Nick Armstrong	974	14.41
Ward 3
Angela Caputo	2,336	29.45
Ron Zagordo	1,982	24.99
Luis Moreno	1,880	23.70
Kurtis McDermid	1,733	21.85
Ward 4
Marchy Bruni (X)	2,308	35.72
Stephan Kinach	1,707	26.42
David Celetti	1,239	19.18
Marek McLeod	1,207	18.68
Ward 5
Corey Gardi (X)	2,094	37.93
Matthew Scott (X)	2,052	37.17
Gideon Down	917	16.61
Martin Poirier	458	8.30

== Spanish ==
The following were the results for mayor of Spanish.

=== Mayor ===
Mayoral Candidate	Vote	%
Karen Von Pickartz	295	87.54
Jocelyne Bishop (X)	42	12.46

== St. Joseph ==
The following were the results for mayor of St. Joseph.

=== Mayor ===
Mayoral Candidate	Vote	%
Jody Wildman (X)	452	49.24
Barry Elliott	361	39.32
Katherine Henshell	105	11.44

== Tarbutt ==
Lennox Smith was re-elected as mayor of Tarbutt by acclamation.

=== Mayor ===
Mayoral Candidate	Vote	%
Lennox Smith (X)	Acclaimed	

== Thessalon ==
Bill Rosenberg was re-elected as mayor of Thessalon by acclamation.

=== Mayor ===
Mayoral Candidate	Vote	%
Bill Rosenberg (X)	Acclaimed	

== Wawa ==
=== Mayor ===
Incumbent mayor Ron Eady did not run for re-election. Deputy mayor Melanie Pilon was elected as mayor by acclamation.

Mayoral Candidate	Vote	%
Melanie Pilon	Acclaimed	

== White River ==
=== Mayor ===
Mayoral Candidate	Vote	%
Tara Anderson Hart	170	54.49
Mark Hubbard	142	45.51
