= 2014 Algoma District municipal elections =

Elections were held in the organized municipalities in the Algoma District of Ontario on October 27, 2014 in conjunction with municipal elections across the province.

== Blind River ==
Mayoral Candidate	Vote	%
Sue Jensen (X)	643	40.11
André Berthelot	580	36.18
Alex Solomon	380	23.71

== Bruce Mines ==
Mayoral Candidate	Vote	%
Lory Patteri (X)	Acclaimed	

== Dubreuilville ==
Mayoral Candidate	Vote	%
Alain Lacroix	207	69.93
Louise Perrier (X)	89	30.07

== Elliot Lake ==
The election in Elliot Lake was significantly impacted by the Algo Centre Mall roof collapse of 2012, and the release of the judicial inquiry's report into the incident just 12 days before the election. Incumbent mayor Rick Hamilton and two incumbent city councillors who ran against him for the mayoralty were all defeated by political newcomer Dan Marchisella, and only one seat on city council was won by an incumbent councillor. Marchisella is also the first mayor in the city's history to have been born in the city.

Mayoral Candidate	Vote	%
Dan Marchisella	2,028	39.71
Al Collett	1,165	22.81
Tom Farquhar	1,100	21.54
Rick Hamilton (X)	814	15.94

== Hilton ==
Mayoral Candidate	Vote	%
Rodney Wood (X)	Acclaimed	

== Hilton Beach ==
Mayoral Candidate	Vote	%
Robert Hope	84	64.12
Hubert Chelli	47	35.88

== Hornepayne ==
Mayoral Candidate	Vote	%
Morley Forster (X)	Acclaimed	

== Huron Shores ==
Mayoral Candidate	Vote	%
Gil Reeves (X)	348	60.73
Boe Eldner	225	39.27

== Jocelyn ==
Mayoral Candidate	Vote	%
Mark Henderson (X)	Acclaimed	

== Johnson ==
Mayoral Candidate	Vote	%
Ted Hicks (X)	Acclaimed	

== Laird ==
Mayoral Candidate	Vote	%
Dick Beitz (X)	279	62.7
Larry Comeau	166	37.3

== Macdonald, Meredith and Aberdeen Additional ==
Mayoral Candidate	Vote	%
Lynn Watson (X)	326	54.97
Derek Hansen	267	45.03

== North Shore ==
Mayoral Candidate	Vote	%
Randi Condie (X)	207	56.40
Melody Rose	160	43.60

== Plummer Additional ==
Mayoral Candidate	Vote	%
Beth West (X)	Acclaimed	

== Prince ==
Mayoral Candidate	Vote	%
Ken Lamming (X)	310	55.16
Antoinette Blunt	252	44.84

== Sault Ste. Marie ==
Mayoral Candidate	Vote	%
Christian Provenzano	12,534	51.22
Debbie Amaroso (X)	10,565	43.18
Ted Johnston	699	2.86
Heather Cook	257	1.05
Robin Coull	217	0.89
Austin Williams	196	0.8

== Spanish ==
Mayoral Candidate	Vote	%
Ted Clague	262	67.70
Gary Bishop (X)	125	32.30

== St. Joseph ==
Mayoral Candidate	Vote	%
Jody Wildman (X)	399	52.92
Bryon Hall	355	47.08

== Tarbutt ==
Mayoral Candidate	Vote	%
Chris Burton (X)	Acclaimed	

== Thessalon ==
Mayoral Candidate	Vote	%
James Orlando	509	93.05
Jan Pawlukiewicz	38	6.95

== Wawa ==
Mayoral Candidate	Vote	%
Ron Rody	1,231	82.18
Linda Nowicki (X)	230	15.35
Ken Martin	37	2.47

== White River ==
Mayoral Candidate	Vote	%
Angelo Bazzoni (X)	267	75.85
Frank Starnyski	85	24.15
