= 2018 Algoma District municipal elections =

Elections were held in the organized municipalities in the Algoma District of Ontario on October 22, 2018 in conjunction with municipal elections across the province.

== Blind River ==
=== Mayor ===
Mayoral Candidate	Vote	%
Sally Hagman	858	55.61
Alex Solomon	456	29.55
Sue Jensen (X)	229	14.84

== Bruce Mines ==
=== Mayor ===
Mayoral Candidate	Vote	%
Lory Patteri (X)	Acclaimed	

== Dubreuilville ==
=== Mayor ===
Mayoral Candidate	Vote	%
Beverly Nantel (X)	Acclaimed	

== Elliot Lake ==
=== Mayor ===
Mayoral Candidate	Vote	%
Dan Marchisella (X)	2,906	94.32
Daemon Jacques-Palmer	175	5.68

== Hilton ==
=== Mayor ===
Mayoral Candidate	Vote	%
Rodney Wood (X)	Acclaimed	

== Hilton Beach ==
=== Mayor ===
Mayoral Candidate	Vote	%
Robert Hope (X)	Acclaimed	

== Hornepayne ==
=== Mayor ===
Mayoral Candidate	Vote	%
Cheryl T. Fort	263	51.98
Willy Paul Liebigt	203	40.12
Michael Courtney	40	7.91

== Huron Shores ==
=== Mayor ===
Mayoral Candidate	Vote	%
Georges Bilodeau	302	64.26
Eloise Eldner	168	35.74

== Jocelyn ==
=== Mayor ===
Mayoral Candidate	Vote	%
Mark Henderson (X)	Acclaimed	

== Johnson ==
=== Mayor ===
Mayoral Candidate	Vote	%
Blaine Mersereau	236	63.78
Marlee Hopkins	134	36.22

== Laird ==
=== Mayor ===
Mayoral Candidate	Vote	%
Dick Beitz (X)	Acclaimed	

== Macdonald, Meredith and Aberdeen Additional ==
=== Mayor ===
Mayoral Candidate	Vote	%
Lynn Watson (X)	362	54.44
Derek Hansen	303	45.56

== North Shore, The ==
=== Mayor ===
Mayoral Candidate	Vote	%
Randi Condie (X)	119	37.66
Joyce Robitaille	116	36.71
Glenn Shelly	81	25.63

=== 2020 mayoral by-election ===
A mayoral by-election was held on September 14, 2020 due to the resignation of Condie.

Mayoral Candidate	Vote	%
Tony Moor	244	63.87
Joyce Robitaille	138	36.13

== Plummer Additional ==
=== Mayor ===
Mayoral Candidate	Vote	%
Beth West (X)	Acclaimed	

== Prince ==
=== Mayor ===
Mayoral Candidate	Vote	%
Ken Lamming (X)	Acclaimed	

== Sault Ste. Marie ==
List of candidates:

=== Mayor ===
Mayoral Candidate	Vote	%
Christian Provenzano (X)	15,303	70.15
Rory Ring	5,143	23.57
Ted Johnston	1,178	5.40
Kemal Martinovic	192	0.88

=== Sault Ste. Marie City Council ===
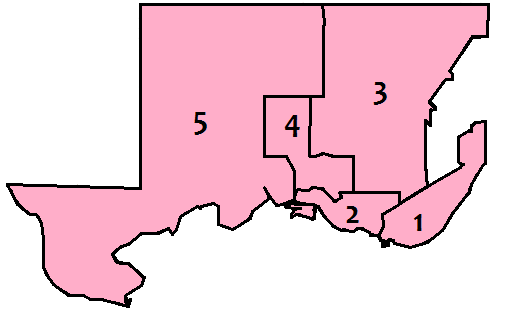
Map of Sault Ste. Marie's five new wards

Two elected per ward.

City council has been reduced in size from 12 members to 10 members (plus the mayor).

Candidate	Vote	%
Ward 1
Paul Christian (X)	3,234	32.11
Sandra Hollingsworth (X)	2,808	27.89
Don Mitchell	2,406	23.89
Michele McCleave-Kennedy	1,385	13.75
Derek Thomas Pearce	238	2.36
Ward 2
Luke Dufour	2,410	32.87
Lisa Vezeau-Allen	1,464	19.97
Lou Turco (X)	1,307	17.83
Sam Cistaro	1,090	14.87
Jason Young	627	8.55
D. J. Thyne	220	3.00
Ted Hallin	213	2.91
Ward 3
Matthew Shoemaker (X)	2,829	33.55
Donna Hilsinger	1,957	23.21
John Bruno	1,921	22.78
Winona Hutchinson	1,099	13.04
Judy Hupponen (X)	625	7.41
Ward 4
Rick Niro (X)	2,016	33.19
Marchy Bruni (X)	1,973	32.48
Sara McCleary	1,387	22.83
Tim Marsh	699	11.51
Ward 5
Matthew Scott	1,465	27.87
Corey Gardi	1,426	27.13
Ozzie Grandinetti (X)	1,399	26.61
Frank Fata (X)	967	18.39

== Spanish ==
=== Mayor ===
Mayoral Candidate	Vote	%
Jocelyne Bishop	196	53.99
Ted Clague (X)	167	46.01

== St. Joseph ==
=== Mayor ===
Mayoral Candidate	Vote	%
Jody Wildman	Acclaimed	

== Tarbutt ==
=== Mayor ===
Mayoral Candidate	Vote	%
Chris Burton (X)	145	62.23
Edwin Karhi	88	37.77

== Thessalon ==
=== Mayor ===
Mayoral Candidate	Vote	%
Bill Rosenberg	Acclaimed	

== Wawa ==
=== Mayor ===
Mayoral Candidate	Vote	%
Ron Rody (X)	Acclaimed	

== White River ==
=== Mayor ===
Mayoral Candidate	Vote	%
Angelo Bazzoni (X)	217	56.66
Raymond St. Louis	166	43.34
