= 2010 Algoma District municipal elections =

Elections were held in the organized municipalities in the Algoma District of Ontario on October 25, 2010, in conjunction with municipal elections across the province.

== Blind River ==
Sue Jensen was elected as the first female mayor of Blind River, taking over 70 per cent of the vote to win over fellow town councillor Vyrn Peterson.

Mayoral Candidate	Vote	%
Sue Jensen	1,197	70.57
Vyrn Peterson	499	29.42

== Bruce Mines ==
In Bruce Mines, incumbent mayor Darren Foster was defeated by Gordon Post, a town councillor whose campaign platform included a pledge to investigate the feasibility of amalgamating the town with the neighbouring township of Plummer Additional.

Mayoral Candidate	Vote	%
Gordon Post	202	56.90
Darren Foster (X)	145	40.84
Douglas J. Ord	8	2.25

== Dubreuilville ==
Louise Perrier defeated incumbent mayor Hélène Perth in Dubreuilville.

Mayoral Candidate	Vote	%
Louise Perrier	185	52.56
Hélène Perth (X)	167	47.44

== Elliot Lake ==
Incumbent mayor Rick Hamilton was re-elected in Elliot Lake. Following the election, Daniel Gagnon, the city's chief administrative officer, was forced to apologize to losing challenger Robert Whitehead for calling him a "smarmy dumbass" on Facebook; during the campaign, Whitehead had questioned whether the city needed a chief administrative officer at all.

Mayoral Candidate	Vote	%
Rick Hamilton (X)	3,032	57.71
Robert Whitehead	2,222	42.29

== Hilton ==
Former Hilton mayor Rodney Wood was returned to office by a margin of just one vote over challenger Jerry Shields.

Mayoral Candidate	Vote	%
Rodney Wood	92	50.27
Jerry Shields	91	49.73

== Hilton Beach ==
The village of Hilton Beach was one of a number of municipalities in the district whose new mayor was acclaimed due to being the only registered candidate at the close of nominations.

Mayoral Candidate	Vote	%
Wilfred Stevens (X)	Acclaimed	

== Hornepayne ==
Morley Forster was declared elected in Hornepayne, winning over councillor Margaret Zajac.

Mayoral Candidate	Vote	%
Morley Forster	316	66.53
Margaret Zajac	159	33.47

== Huron Shores ==
The township of Huron Shores was one of a number of municipalities in the district whose mayor was acclaimed due to being the only registered candidate at the close of nominations. Incumbent mayor Ted Linley ran for re-election as a council candidate in Ward 3 rather than as mayor.

Mayoral Candidate	Vote	%
Gil Reeves	Acclaimed	

== Jocelyn ==
Incumbent mayor Mark Henderson was declared re-elected in Jocelyn over Sheila Campbell, who had previously run against him in the 2006 election.

Mayoral Candidate	Vote	%
Mark Henderson (X)	299	57.61
Sheila Campbell	220	42.39

== Johnson ==
Challenger Ted Hicks defeated incumbent mayor Edith Orr in Johnson.

Mayoral Candidate	Vote	%
Ted Hicks	217	56.81
Edith Orr (X)	165	43.19

== Laird ==
The township of Laird was one of a number of municipalities in the district whose mayor was acclaimed due to being the only registered candidate at the close of nominations.

Mayoral Candidate	Vote	%
Dick Beitz (X)	Acclaimed	

== Macdonald, Meredith and Aberdeen Additional ==
The township of Macdonald, Meredith and Aberdeen Additional was one of a number of municipalities in the district whose mayor was acclaimed due to being the only registered candidate at the close of nominations.

Mayoral Candidate	Vote	%
Lynn Watson (X)	Acclaimed	

== North Shore ==
Randi Condie defeated incumbent mayor Heather Pelky in the township of North Shore.

Mayoral Candidate	Vote	%
Randi Condie	254	54.27
Heather Pelky (X)	214	45.73

== Plummer Additional ==
Incumbent mayor Beth West was re-elected in Plummer Additional.

Mayoral Candidate	Vote	%
Beth West (X)	233	83.51
Russell Desjardine	46	16.49

== Prince ==
Former councillor Ken Lamming defeated mayor Lou Madonna in the township of Prince. Lamming campaigned on his desire to keep the municipality's taxes "lower than everybody else in Algoma District". During the previous council term, Lamming had been involved in an employment dispute with the township, when the council fired him as chief of its volunteer fire department for leaking details of a workers' compensation claim to Sault Ste. Marie's media.

Mayoral Candidate	Vote	%
Ken Lamming	334	52.76
Lou Madonna (X)	299	47.24

== Sault Ste. Marie ==
In a race which was complicated by the death in office of former mayor John Rowswell on August 31, 2010, former city councillor Debbie Amaroso narrowly defeated sitting city councillor James Caicco to become Sault Ste. Marie's first elected female mayor.

The city is divided into six wards, each of which is represented by two councillors on Sault Ste. Marie City Council. In the 2010 election, there was one open seat in Ward 1, as councillor James Caicco ran for mayor, and one in Ward 3, where Bryan Hayes did not seek re-election as he had chosen instead to run for federal office in the 2011 federal election. All of the other 10 incumbent councillors ran for re-election. The remaining incumbents in Ward 1 and Ward 3 and both incumbents in Ward 2 were re-elected, while in the other three wards one incumbent won re-election but the other was defeated.

A municipal referendum to determine whether voters favoured allowing stores to open on Boxing Day was held concurrently with the election. Sault Ste. Marie is one of only a few cities in Ontario where a municipal bylaw prevents stores from opening on December 26; as in Sudbury, retail stores in Sault Ste. Marie instead begin their post-Christmas Boxing Day sales on December 27. Although voter turnout was not high enough to make the referendum legally binding, meaning that city council is free to disregard the results if it chooses to revisit the issue in the future, 60.77 per cent of voters opposed allowing stores to open.

=== Mayor ===
Mayoral Candidate	Vote	%
Debbie Amaroso	11,110	40.23
James Caicco	10,293	37.27
Julie Hryniewicz	4,148	15.02
Ron Schinners	2,068	7.48

=== Councillors ===
Ward 1 Candidate	Vote	%
Steve Butland (incumbent)	3,910	43.00
Paul Christian	2,854	31.39
Mac Headrick	2,329	25.61
Ward 2 Candidate	Vote	%
Terry Sheehan (incumbent)	4,022	50.62
Susan Myers (incumbent)	3,137	39.48
Michael Selvers	787	9.90
Ward 3 Candidate	Vote	%
Brian Watkins	2,967	37.96
Pat Mick (incumbent)	2,268	29.02
Bryan Dumanski	1,119	14.31
Luke Macmichael	858	10.98
Kelly Marshall	604	7.73
Ward 4 Candidate	Vote	%
Lou Turco (incumbent)	2,158	34.07
Rick Niro	2,055	32.45
Lorena Tridico (incumbent)	1,374	21.70
Alan Smith	746	11.78
Ward 5 Candidate	Vote	%
Marchy Bruni	1,928	26.53
Frank Fata (incumbent)	1,927	26.52
Duane Jones	1,307	17.98
David Celetti (incumbent)	1,300	17.89
Mark Brown	492	6.77
John Bumbacco	313	4.31
Ward 6 Candidate	Vote	%
Joe Krmpotich	1,795	23.73
Frank Manzo (incumbent)	1,501	19.85
Ozzie Grandinetti (incumbent)	1,285	16.99
Tony Mancuso	1,229	16.25
Jeff Arbus	1,025	13.55
Andy Anich	728	9.63

== Spanish ==
Incumbent mayor Gary Bishop was re-elected in Spanish.

Mayoral Candidate	Vote	%
Gary Bishop (X)	297	63.6
Laurence Massicotte	170	36.4

== St. Joseph ==
The township of St. Joseph was one of a number of municipalities in the district whose mayor was acclaimed due to being the only registered candidate at the close of nominations.

Mayoral Candidate	Vote	%
Jody Wildman (X)	Acclaimed	

== Tarbutt ==
The township of Tarbutt was one of a number of municipalities in the district whose mayor was acclaimed due to being the only registered candidate at the close of nominations.

Mayoral Candidate	Vote	%
Ken Richie (X)	Acclaimed	

== Thessalon ==
Brent Rankin, who had previously served as mayor of Thessalon from 1985 to 1994, ran for another term as mayor after incumbent Donna Latulippe announced that she would not be seeking re-election. He won an overwhelming victory over challenger Jan Pawlukiewicz.

Mayoral Candidate	Vote	%
Brent Rankin	605	92.51
Jan Pawlukiewicz	49	7.49

== Wawa ==
Town councillor Linda Nowicki narrowly defeated incumbent mayor Howard Whent, becoming the first female mayor of Wawa.

Mayoral Candidate	Vote	%
Linda Nowicki	557	39.93
Howard Whent (X)	530	37.99
Ken Martin	308	22.08

== White River ==
The township of White River was one of a number of municipalities in the district whose mayor was acclaimed due to being the only registered candidate at the close of nominations.

Mayoral Candidate	Vote	%
Angelo Bazzoni (X)	Acclaimed	
