= Rydal Bank Church =

Church building in Plummer Additional, Canada

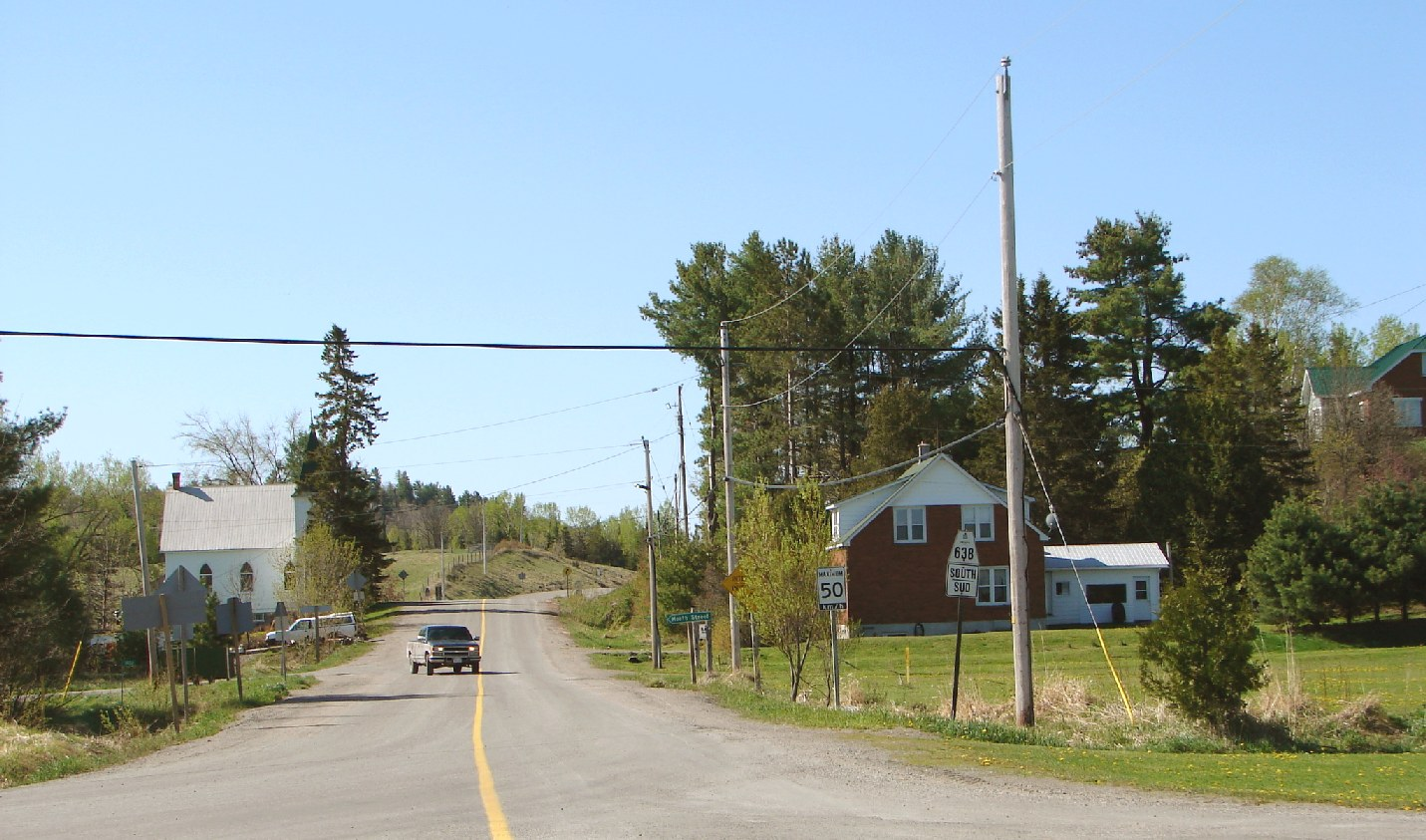
- Rydal Bank church
- Interactive map of the Rydal Bank Church area

General information
- Architectural style: Carpenter Gothic
- Location: Rydal Bank, Ontario, Canada
- Coordinates: 46°21′41″N 83°44′34″W
- Construction started: 1907
- Completed: 1908

Technical details
- Structural system: single-storey wooden

Design and construction
- Main contractor: Builders: Walter Robinson & Walter Robinson, Jr.

The former Rydal Bank Church, also known as the Rydal Bank Presbyterian Church and the Rydal Bank United Church, is an historic Carpenter Gothic-style church building located at 1634 Highway 638, in Rydal Bank in the township of Plummer Additional, north of Bruce Mines, Ontario, Canada. Completed in 1908, its wooden frame exterior, corner entry-bell tower, steep pitched roof and lancet windows are typical of Carpenter Gothic style churches. It was built to serve a Presbyterian congregation which joined the United Church of Canada in 1925 when that new denomination was formed.

The church closed in 1978 and was bought in 1989 by the Rydal Bank Historical Society which has restored it and maintains it as a museum named the Rydal Bank Community Hall and Church. A church service is held once a year and the building is also available for weddings and other events.

The church is a municipal heritage site as designated by Plummer Additional on November 22, 2006.

== Affiliations ==
The Museum is affiliated with: CMA, CHIN, and Virtual Museum of Canada.
