= White Mountain Academy of the Arts =

Former art school in Elliot Lake, Canada

The White Mountain Academy of the Arts was an art school based in Elliot Lake, Ontario, Canada. Formally opened to students in 1998, the academy sought to combine European and First Nations approaches to painting, photography, graphic design, and other arts forms. James Bartleman, the Lieutenant-Governor of Ontario, became an honorary patron in August 2004.

== History ==
The original committee which sought to establish the school, the Northern Institute of the Arts Planning Commission, acquired the building, a former Canada Centre for Mineral and Energy Technology (CANMET) research laboratory, in 1998.

White Mountain was located in a fairly isolated area in Northern Ontario, and it never received enough students or donations to survive as an institution. It folded in 2006, after failing to secure status as a degree-granting institution. During its operation, however, it did grant its own certificates and diplomas, and offered degree programming in collaboration with OCAD University in Toronto, leading to a Bachelor of Fine Arts (BFA). It only offered its four-year program to one cohort of eleven students. However, many subsequently transferred to OCAD in Toronto or other fine arts programs.

== The White Mountain Campus ==
Originally housing a nuclear research laboratory, the building features three naturally lit floors with several rooms from each floor, centred upon a massive arboretum, spanning the steps from the first to second floors. After the school's closure, the building was subsequently leased by the city, and served primarily as a storage depot for municipal equipment.

Beginning in 2012, the White Mountain building became a temporary home to the Elliot Lake Public Library and other services displaced by the Algo Centre Mall roof collapse. Having been shut for several years, the building required significant renovations for this purpose.

The library faced controversy over its planned final location in 2013, with the board favouring remaining at White Mountain while many users preferred a move to the more centrally located Pearson Plaza. The library ultimately announced that it would move to Pearson Plaza, after White Mountain declined to offer the institution a long-term stable lease.

Elliot Lake's city council subsequently faced controversy around significant cost overruns in the 2012 renovation project, as well as other municipal investments in the building and its maintenance.

As at October 2016, the building remains in use providing host to a variety of tenants, including the Nuclear Waste Management Organisation, Service Canada, a dance studio, the business incubator and some of their clients. The board, officially the Northern Institute of the Arts, remains active whilst plans are to dissolve the board after the sale of an art collection. The building, now owned by the city of Elliot Lake, was reported as having been sold for $200,000 to a multinational firm, Eissa Group. It was later clarified in council that this was misreported in that it was not sold yet, but only a conditional offer made.

Sometime prior to July 2020 the building was sold to the Eissa Group of Toronto Ontario. The building which is now privately owned flooded during the winter of 2019 - 2020 due to frozen pipes and received extensive damage throughout including a significant mold issue. The last business vacated in the fall of 2019. The building remains vacant and derelict as of 2024, and has been subject to significant vandalism and mischief.

== See also ==
- Algo Centre Mall#History
