= Lester B. Pearson Civic Centre =

Arts centre in Ontario, Canada

Coordinates: 46°23′04″N 82°38′35″W

The Lester B. Pearson Civic Centre was located in Elliot Lake, Ontario, Canada, It was a community arts and theatre center that also housed community offices. Locals commonly referred to it as “the Civic Centre.” The building originally housed the Nordic Hotel, built when the town was first opening its mines. Later, it became the site of many community events and the location of many arts clubs, as well as the Welcome Centre, the Art Gallery, and the Elliot Lake Nuclear and Mining Museum. Following its collapse in February 2019 the City of Elliot Lake has been left without an arts and theatre center.

== History ==
=== Nordic Hotel ===
The Nordic Hotel was one of the first 3 hotels built in Elliot Lake before 1960. Each hotel had approximately 30 rooms as well as beer parlors enjoyed by the community. Completed first was the Nordic hotel which contained 40 rooms and a dining room. For a time, it boasted the “biggest bar in Algoma.” The Nordic Hotel operated as such until the first mining “bust” in the 1970s, following the termination of the 5-year US uranium mining contracts. The Elliot Lake Nuclear and Mining Museum opened during this time and ran out of the old bar room of another hotel: the Elliot Lake Hotel. The Mining Museum opened June 3, 1963, funded and organized largely by the Province of Ontario, and by August 7 of that year it had attracted 10 000 visitors. The Toronto firm Disney Displays was responsible for setting up the exhibition models.

=== Town Hall ===
The Nordic hotel became the temporary site of the town hall after it went out of business. For a short while, a church was using the old dining room to hold service.

=== Conversion to Theatre and Arts Centre ===
After a transitionary period, the building was purchased by a local arts and culture group, who converted it to a cultural and live theatre center. The theatre took up one wing of the building, with craft rooms in the basement, and a local art museum in the other wing. The theatre was built to seat 360 people and contained a small stage, with sound and lighting equipment for small productions, as well as a backstage room and dressing rooms repurposed from the original hotel rooms, bathrooms included. During this time, the building was renamed after Prime Minister Lester B. Pearson, who had served the Algoma East riding as a Member of Parliament, and had a political interest in maintaining the mines of Elliot Lake. While serving as Prime Minister, Lester B. Pearson had the Government of Canada stockpile uranium for a year, then 5 years, allowing mines in Elliot Lake to remain open while navigating the period between the completed U.S. uranium mining contracts and potential new contracts with Nuclear Power companies.

=== Transfer of Operations to the City of Elliot Lake ===
The arts and culture group could not afford to keep the center operating, so in the mid-1990s they turned it over to the City of Elliot Lake. Upon its acquisition, the City moved the Elliot Lake Nuclear and Mining Museum into the basement, added a tourism Welcome Centre desk and renovated the upper floor to rentable office space. In the 2000s the office space became the home of the SERCO drive test office, the ELNOS offices, and MP Carol Hughes’ office. The city began running community events out of the theatre space as well as renting it out to local groups.

== Architecture ==
The Civic Centre was built originally as a hotel, and though it underwent many architectural changes, it retained several hotel features. Originally, it was a simple wood-framed building. The two wings encompassed a courtyard in front of the main entrance. During the renovation to include the theatre space, a steel structure was added to increase the roof span. The façade was covered in a neutral-toned paneling, and kept the original rectangular windows from the hotel, except in the theatre and main lobbies, which had floor to ceiling windows installed. Although no other building in Elliot Lake uses the same paneling, the Civic Centre had a similar utilitarian style and color palette as City Hall. Due to the unique paneling, and its position as the main tourist hub and community events center, the Civic Centre was a notable, landmark building in Elliot Lake.

== Community Events ==
A few of the arts and culture groups located in the Civic Centre (with some changes over the years) included:

- the Elliot Lake Arts Club, with painting, pottery, and weaving studios
- the Elliot Lake Model Railroad Club
- Arts & Culture Roundtable In Elliot Lake (ARIEL)
- Association canadienne-française de l'Ontario (ACFO)
- Elliot Lake Amateur Theatre Ensemble (ELATE)
- Suite Music (used only for performances)
- Studio Dance Arts, formerly Danceworks (used only for performances)
- the Elliot Lake Entertainment Series (ELES)
- Digital Creator North
- Precious Ladies Productions
- Stage Door Players (SDP)

The Civic Centre became the primary building for Elliot Lake community events. Events such as the annual community Christmas Concert, the Arts on the Trail Festival, and Christmas and Spring craft fairs were headquartered from this building. All community parades would start at the Civic Centre and end at the W.H. Collins Centre on Hillside Dr. S, including the annual Pride Parade and Pride Show. The theatre hosted many visiting artists and live performers from across Canada, brought by the Elliot Lake Entertainment Series on a monthly basis. Other local groups would rent the space for performances, such as ELATE, the SDP, the local dance studio (formerly Danceworks, now Studio Dance Arts), and Suite Music's many choirs and instrumental groups. Notably, the Civic Centre also hosted community meetings too large for City Hall after the 2012 collapse of the Algo Centre Mall.

== Theatre Collapse ==
February 21, 2019, the roof over the theatre collapsed. There were only 5 people inside the theatre at the time, though the collapse occurred only a few minutes before a scheduled rehearsal by ELATE, for their opening night of “Shorthanded” the next day. Had it happened several minutes later, 10 or so people would have been directly under the roof that fell, and if it had been 24 hours later, 300 people would have been inside the theatre to watch the show. There was public speculation that the collapse was due to a combination of an improperly installed HVAC system a few years prior, that exceeded the recommended weight load of the roof, and the heavy snow load received that winter. There was only one person affected with minor injuries, and officials ruled that the collapse occurred due to built up snow load rather than any engineering or inspection failure. The damage to the building was severe and prompted the city to close other municipal buildings, including the Centennial Arena and the Ruben Yli Juuti Pool, to assess their snow loads and take safety precautions such as clearing the roofs.

== Demolition ==
Initially the City of Elliot Lake speculated that repairs could be made to the Civic Centre, however, the anticipated cost of repair was $3.7 million. Many members of the public thought it would be better to demolish the building and build a new arts and sports complex, which has been a talking point at Council Meetings for several years. Many local politicians reported receiving feedback in favor of demolition and a new center, an idea supported by the Nuclear and Mining Museum Advisory Board, as well as other arts groups in the city. In October 2019, a city council meeting was held to decide if council wanted to proceed with the costly repairs or opt for demolition. The cost of demolition was weighed against the historical cost to the community, and the final decision was to demolish the Civic Centre. The new goal was to apply for grants as well as use the insurance money to build a new arts center, estimated at $8- to- $12 million. In December, Colin's Haulage won the bid to demolish the civic center for $205,250. The Insurance settlement was just over $3.5 million, which more than covered that cost.

Everything that could be saved was salvaged from the wreckage, including several items of historic value to the community. One of the items salvaged from the demolition were the bronze Denison Mine front doors, which were works of art depicting scenes from the mines. Other items salvaged were huge B.C. fir beams from the basement and some marble tiles, as well as all art and museum pieces that could be accessed.

== Aftermath ==
The collapse of the Civic Centre forced the tenants to relocate. Some have found permanent homes since the demolition, while others are still in temporary spaces. The municipally owned W. H. Collins Centre (known locally as the “Collins Hall”) has become the main space for theatre activities, due to the City installing an “enhanced performance space” in the existing stage of the gymnasium. Groups such as the Elliot Lake Entertainment Series, the Stage Door Players, and the Elliot Lake Amateur Theatre Ensemble have all relocated there. In addition, the city has moved the Elliot Lake Welcome Centre (for tourism) to the Collin's Hall offices. The Elliot Lake Nuclear and Mining Museum was damaged in the collapse and has not yet found a location to reopen with the salvaged artifacts. Some artifacts have been placed temporarily in the Fire Tower Lookout Ranger's Station, though the Canadian Mining Hall of Fame was not among them. The Art Gallery and Digital Creator North have been relocated to open retail spaces downtown. The other offices, groups, and crafts rooms have been relocated to various retail spaces, churches, and community spaces around the city.
