= Debbie Amaroso =

Canadian politician

Mayor of Sault Ste. Marie
- In office December 1, 2010 – October 27, 2014
- Preceded by: Ozzie Grandinetti (interim)
- Succeeded by: Christian Provenzano

Debbie Amaroso, née Jannison is a Canadian politician, who was elected mayor of Sault Ste. Marie, Ontario in the 2010 municipal election.

== Career ==
She was the city's first elected female mayor, although two female councillors, Lorena Tridico and Susan Myers, each served one month as acting mayor following the death in office of John Rowswell in August 2010.

Her platform was a balanced approach to community development, and her campaign slogan was "Your city, your say". She previously represented Ward 5 on Sault Ste. Marie City Council from 1997 until 2006, when she ran unsuccessfully for mayor against Rowswell in the 2006 municipal election.

She was defeated by Christian Provenzano in the 2014 municipal election.

In April 2017, she announced that she was seeking the Ontario Liberal Party nomination for the by-election in Sault Ste. Marie. In April 2017, she was acclaimed as the Liberal candidate but went on to lose the June 1, 2017 by-election to Progressive Conservative Ross Romano and place third.

== Electoral record ==
2006 Sault Ste. Marie municipal election: Mayor of Sault Ste. Marie
| Candidate | Votes | % |
|---|---|---|
| John Rowswell | 15,932 | 56.47 |
| Debbie Amaroso | 8,460 | 29.98 |
| Fred Dovigi | 3,822 | 13.55 |
| Total valid votes | 28,214 | 100.00 |

2010 Algoma District municipal election: Mayor of Sault Ste. Marie
| Candidate | Votes | % |
|---|---|---|
| Debbie Amaroso | 11,110 | 40.23 |
| James Caicco | 10,293 | 37.27 |
| Julie Hryniewicz | 4,148 | 15.02 |
| Ron Schinners | 2,068 | 7.48 |
| Total valid votes | 27,619 | 100.00 |

2014 municipal election, Mayor of Sault Ste. Marie

| Mayoral Candidate | Vote | % |
|---|---|---|
| Christian Provenzano | 12,534 | 51.22 |
| Debbie Amaroso | 10,565 | 43.18 |
| Ted Johnston | 699 | 2.86 |
| Heather Cook | 257 | 1.05 |
| Robin Coull | 217 | 0.89 |
| Austin Williams | 196 | 0.8 |

Ontario provincial by-election, June 1, 2017 Resignation of David Orazietti
| Party | Candidate | Votes | % | ±% |
|---|---|---|---|---|
| Progressive Conservative | Ross Romano | 10,411 | 40.37 | +27.98 |
| New Democratic | Joe Krmpotich | 8,465 | 32.82 | +7.63 |
| Liberal | Debbie Amaroso | 5,935 | 23.01 | –35.57 |
| Green | Kara Flannigan | 512 | 1.98 | –1.25 |
| None of the Above | Above Znoneofthe | 313 | 1.21 | |
| Libertarian | Gene Balfour | 71 | 0.28 | –0.10 |
| Pauper | John Turmel | 47 | 0.18 | |
| Total valid votes | | 25,785 | 100.0 | |
| Turnout | | | 43.93 | |
| Registered electors | | 58,690 | | |
| Progressive Conservative gain from Liberal | | Swing | | +10.14 |
Source: Elections Ontario
