= Christian Provenzano =

Canadian politician from Ontario

His Worship Christian Provenzano

Mayor of Sault Ste. Marie, Ontario
- In office December 1, 2014 – November 15, 2022
- Preceded by: Debbie Amaroso
- Succeeded by: Matthew Shoemaker

Personal details
- Occupation: Mayor

Christian Provenzano is a Canadian politician, who was elected mayor of Sault Ste. Marie, Ontario, in the 2014 municipal election. He served as mayor until 2022.

== Career ==
The nephew of former federal Member of Parliament Carmen Provenzano, he previously ran for election to Parliament as the Liberal candidate in the electoral district of Sault Ste. Marie in the 2006 federal election and the 2011 federal election. He used to work for the Liberal Party as chief of staff to former leader Michael Ignatieff.

He secured re-election to a second term by a wide margin in the 2018 municipal election, garnering 70.15% of the vote.

During his first term in office following the 2014 municipal election, the City dealt with significant economic challenges related to its largest employers – a downturn in oil prices led to wide-spread layoffs at Tenaris Algoma Tubes and Essar Steel began Companies' Creditors Arrangement Act proceedings. In the midst of these challenges and to address the root causes behind them, Provenzano led the City through the development of a community plan called, FutureSSM. It resulted in the City advancing efforts to build the local labour force, address social inequities, celebrate arts and culture, grow local post-secondary institutions, advance Indigenous relationships, revitalize the downtown and welcome newcomers.

Provenzano moved forward with the establishment of the Mayor's Advisory Council (MYAC) shortly after he was elected as Mayor. MYAC provides local youth with an opportunity to have a positive impact on youth through advocacy for issues, causes and organizations they are passionate about, and it continues to make a difference in Sault Ste. Marie.

Provenzano also led the formation of the Bawating Advisory Circle in 2018. It has representation from Batchewana First Nation, Garden River First Nation, Historic Sault Ste. Marie Metis Council, Metis Nation of Ontario Youth Council, Indian Friendship Centre, Sault College Indigenous Students Sacred Native Student Council, Algoma University Anishinaabe Initiatives and Children of Shingwauk Alumni Association. It was formed to help act on the calls to action issued by the Truth and Reconciliation Commission of Canada.

Provenzano has sat on several boards throughout his mayoralty including the PUC Services. During his time on the board, the PUC decreased energy and service costs to city by changing all the streetlights to LED, acquired Northern Waterworks Inc. and as a result became the second largest service provider of water and wastewater operations in Ontario.

In 2021, Provenzano confirmed he would not seek re-election in 2022.
