= Pearson Plaza =

- Location: Elliot Lake, Ontario, Canada
- Coordinates: 46°22′58″N 82°38′44″W
- Opened: Spring 2016
- Num. of stores: 6
- Num. of anchor tenants: 2
- Floor area: Over 60,000 square feet (5,600 m^{2})
- Parking: Ground level

Pearson Plaza is a small indoor shopping complex in Elliot Lake, Ontario. Located on the site of a former rock (later Huron Lodge), at Hillside Drive South and Ontario Avenue, it replaced the Algo Centre Mall, which was demolished after its roof collapsed.

McCowan & Associates is the mall landlord.

== History ==
The mall's Foodland grocery store was to be open by January 1, 2014, and the remainder open in fall 2015. Foodland was the mall's first store, but it opened on April 1, 2016. Turner's department store was next to open (December 6, 2016), followed by Dollarama (January 2017), the library (May 2017), and the two-restaurant food court opened in summer 2017 with Chantis Fresh Cafe, owned by Turners Elliot Lake. The mall has a spot at the south end, where detached units could be built.

In May 2018 Chantis was sold and became CC'S Bistro & Café. In May 2019, Turners Department Store and CC's Bistro & Cafe closed.

Attempting to fill the store and attract a general retailer to the city, the City of Elliot Lake began leasing the space for $10,000 a month. The city did not issue a formal request for proposals, but attempted to attract various stores. As of 2012, an upper-level tier of government offered funding for retailers to enter remote communities, but all declined. Some stated that they'd need at least 20,000 square feet. Attempting to attract Giant Tiger, the company categorically refused, as it already operated in Espanola, and intended to open in Sault Ste. Marie. The community was also unable to attract "a micro Walmart." Mayor Dan Marchisella blamed the fact that household income in the community was below the poverty line, and retailers weren't looking at the accumulated wealth of retirees.

The Turners' unit was finally filled by a Hart Home Store, in December 2020. To attract the business to the community, the city itself agreed to lease the space for six years, in exchange for 10 per cent of profit. The city is paying for the space.

== Retailers ==
- library
- Dailies II
- Foodland
- Investors Group
- Miss Jones, cannabis retailer
- New Orleans Pizza
- Quality Flowers
- Robins Donuts
- Subway

== Funding and design ==
Due to the Algo Centre situation, and the tremendous social and economic impact it had on Elliot Lake as a small city with few other major retail outlets, the project was funded almost entirely by the provincial and federal governments. The Government of Ontario and the Government of Canada each provided $1 million in funding, with the remaining $1.5 million being provided via an amortized loan from Infrastructure Ontario.

Pearson Plaza was designed as a single floor complex with a series of big box stores to be anchored by Foodland and Canadian Tire, and the number of retail tenants totaling 20 to 22. It has been modified to be a grocery store, department store, dollar store, library and small food court.

The land purchase for the new mall was completed by developer Ron McCowan in March 2014 but by October construction on the property had not been started.

=== Naming ===
The development name Pearson may refer to the Right Honourable Lester Pearson, the Nobel Peace Prize-winning former Prime Minister of Canada, who served as the Member of Parliament for Algoma East, including Elliot Lake, from 1948 to 1968.

== See also ==
- Algo Centre Mall#History
