= Algo Centre Mall =

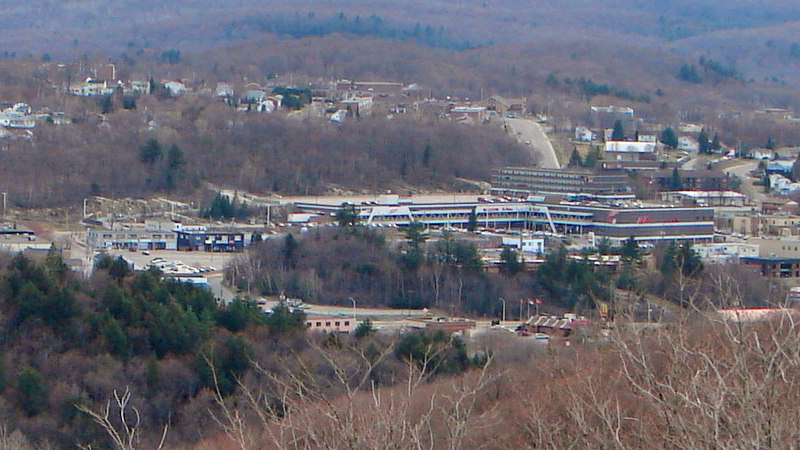
- Algo Centre Mall in 2006
- Location: Elliot Lake, Ontario, Canada
- Coordinates: 46°23′04″N 82°39′00″W
- Address: 151 Ontario Avenue
- Opened: August 1980
- Closed: June 23, 2012
- Developer: Algocen Realty Holdings Ltd.
- Manager: Rhonda Bear
- Owner: Eastwood Mall Incorporated, Toronto (2005–present); Elliot Lake Retirement Living (1999–2005); Algocen Realty Holdings Limited (1980–1999)
- Architect: James Keywan (architect); Beta Engineering
- Num. of stores: 50
- Num. of anchor tenants: 3
- Floor area: 190,000 sq ft (18,000 m^{2}) (17,600 m^{2})
- Floors: 2 (retails); 2 (hotel)
- Parking: Ground level and roof
- Website: Archive of website

The Algo Centre Mall (legally Eastwood Mall since 2005 but almost never referred to as such) was a mall and hotel located near Highway 108 in Elliot Lake, Ontario, Canada. It was the largest commercial complex in the area. When the community was hit by uranium mine closures in the 1990s, the complex gradually refocused, hosting multiple services, such as a library, constituency offices, and public health offices. In the years leading up to 2012, many businesses located in the mall either closed or moved to outside locations. Still, the mall was a community hub, with most of the area's clothing stores and its largest grocery store, employing upwards of 250 local residents. It accounted for 10% of the community's retail space and 6% of the total wages.

The mall was plagued by structural problems and leaks throughout its history. It underwent a partial structural failure on June 23, 2012, when a 12m x 24m (39'-by-79') segment of the rooftop parking deck collapsed into the building, crashing through the upper level lottery kiosk adjacent to the food court and escalators to the ground floor below. Two people died in the collapse and more than 20 people received non-life-threatening injuries. An investigation and class action lawsuits into the collapse are ongoing and the mall has been demolished.

The city of Elliot Lake purchased the vacant former Algo Centre Mall site in 2019, as the first stage in redeveloping the land for new residential and commercial uses. Part of the site will be retained by the city as a municipal "community hub" project, while the rest of it will be sold back to residential and commercial developers.

== History ==
Algocen Realty Holdings Ltd., the real estate branch on the Algoma Central Railway, commissioned the Algo Centre Mall project. The project was subsequently approved by the Ontario Municipal Board in 1978, with an estimated cost of $10 million. Construction began in 1979 and the project was finished the next year. The 80-room Algo Inn, the town's largest hotel and retirement residence, was also built into the mall. In its first year, 1980, the mall featured Woolco, Dominion, and Shoppers Drug Mart, and a total of 35 units. A distinctive architectural feature of the building was rooftop parking.

After the closure of the uranium mines in Elliot Lake, in 1990, the revenue prospects of the mall dropped sharply, with no recovery in sight. This prompted the Algoma Central Company to write off over $5 million in lost property value, despite 98% occupancy.

In 1996, a report commissioned by the Town, Downtown Core and Industrial Area Improvements, presented a less-than-favourable assessment of the structure's exterior:

A very significant building within the downtown core is formed by the Algo Mall/Algo Inn. Situated above Ontario Avenue and fronted by parking lots, this large building is clad mostly in brown prefinished metal siding. The entrances are remote and do not address the street. The scale of the building, its introverted nature and the lack of tactile materials, detail, and transparency at the pedestrian level, do little to contribute to the urban environment. The Mall and the Hotel are a terrific amenities and likely contribute greatly to the attraction of shoppers and visitors to the downtown core, but the design is less than sensitive to its urban environment.

The final owners, Eastwood Incorporated, acquired the company in August 2005 for the price of $6.2 million. This firm, owned by Bob Nazarian, was registered in 1994 as a numbered company. At various points, the company has owned strip malls in Kitchener and London, Ontario. Algo had retained Marino Locations Limited to redevelop the property "to accommodate new specialty retailers and possible new anchor/big-box retailers that are not yet in the market. The possibility for exterior pads also exists on the surrounding lands." (Read Jones Christoffersen Ltd. also performed a redevelopment feasibility study on the mall in late 2010, early 2011; part of the cost was not repaid.) Between August 2005 and June 2012, the mall had a series of five managers.

Zellers received $1 million from the City of Elliot Lake to open.

At some point in the summer of 2008, a location of SAAN, a department store, closed. The Bargain! Shop purchased the brand in August of that year, taking over some leaseholds. In September that year, Mayor Rick Hamilton located his campaign office at the mall. In January 2009, the Elliot Lake Model Railroad Club opened at the local civic centre, moving from the mall. In 2010, a new Shoppers Drug Mart opened away from the mall, more than doubling the 7,000 feet (2,100 m) unit it had at Algo. The mall was offered for sale in 2010, for $9.9 million, an increase of $3.7 million from the purchase price five years prior. In 2011, the hotel office was victim of a break-and-enter, with an attempt to do the same at Zellers.

The mall hosted car shows, charity head shavings, antique appraisals, promotions for community events, an annual rocking chair marathon for charity, amongst other community events.

Despite the centre's issues, it remained a community hub; the mayor notes that it was the social centre of the community, and residents would visit weekly, and in some cases daily.

== Structural problems ==
By 1990, the mall was already regularly plagued with leaks and water damage.

The Elliot Lake Standard reported in 2008 on "greater than normal" leaks causing damages to multiple units. Starlight Cafe closed permanently, despite being profitable soon after opening, as customers would occasionally need umbrellas to stand at the take-out counter. Drip-tarps installed by the mall in the kitchen of the restaurant were ineffective. The cafe owner was not made aware of the leaks before starting her lease in 2007, and was successful in a lawsuit against the owner. Scotiabank had closed for a few weeks in 2008 as a precaution. (Scotiabank began construction on a new location in July 2011, to replace their mall location.) Some businesses suggested that additional leaks started after the new owner started repairs to the roof. Tenants noticed a reduced amount of traffic after leaks started, and buckets were scattered throughout the mall.

In 2009, leaks in the mall roof and mould caused Elliot Lake city councillors to consider moving the Elliot Lake Public Library out of the mall and back to the Solomon Building, where it had been before 1992. Many books were damaged, despite library staff using tarps to cover shelves. At some points, entire sections were blocked for public health reasons. Much of the leaking was said to be corrected, before council considered the issue, and an environmental study was completed. Some library board members and councillors worried that liability insurance wouldn't cover them in the mall, despite reassurances by library management and the city's insurance broker. With a multi-use complex in the works, some of the library board was concerned with a five-year lease that mall management was pursuing, despite the library's preference for a 2½-year lease. In the end, the library remained at the mall.

Some tenants suggest that mall business owners were said to not be vocal about their disappointments, unless "water is dripping right on their head (or) if the water is destroying their business"; conversely, one previous mall manager suggests he was called daily by tenants about the issue, before 2008 repairs started. The owner was aware of the mall's roof problems when purchasing the facility, and suggested there would be renovations to the mall, but would not commit to a date for completing roof repairs or interior upgrades. Over $1 million was spent in an attempt to repair the roof. Architect John Clinckett of Kitchener was hired to oversee the project; Canadian Construction Controls of Breslau declined to bid to install a membrane created by Carlisle Syntec Systems. Taking issue with the $1-million cost, Nazarian cancelled the project, hiring Peak Restoration; only a fraction of Peak's $823,657 worth of work was paid for, and the lien expired in 2010. The mall manager left soon after, in summer 2008, suggesting that he believes mall maintenance staff were set to repair the roof. In spite of the issues, the mall would use the roof for events. In 2011 and 2012, it served as the site for the Heart and Stroke Foundation's Big Bike ride.

In June 2011, a piece of concrete fell through the ceiling at a mall restaurant, Hungry Jack's. Reports were filed with the mall manager and the city, with an inspector scheduled to visit two weeks following the incident. The inspector did not show, and mall management did not reply. Hungry Jack's is near to the eventual mall roof collapse. Mall owners continued repair and maintenance work in 2012, spending $120,000 into repairs within the 12-month period leading up to June 2012. An engineering and structural study "turned up nothing", according to the mall manager. Even after the repair, there were photos of serious interior damage to the mall's roof. A local plumber that had done work for the mall suggested there was obvious signs of water damage, eight months before the collapse. In March 2012, the mall management pleaded guilty in provincial court, after their fire alarms and sprinklers did not meet code. The mall spent $50,000 to upgrade the infrastructure to avoid further fines. The process included adding a new roof to the hotel, gutting the second and third floors, including the hotel lounge.

The problem was very obvious to residents of the town. During the press conference announcing the class-action lawsuit, a resident suggested that some residents had placed "bets" on when the building would collapse. Ontario's Ministry of Labour visited the mall six times in the three years before the collapse.

Pinchin Ltd. issued an "unequivocal" report attesting to the soundness of the structure and deemed the corrosion "not of structural significance."

At the 2013 inquest into the roof collapse (see #Government reaction below), testimony has revealed that many unpublicized structural problems at the mall dated all the way back to its initial construction in the late 1970s. In particular, the expansion joint above the escalators, the failure of which appears to have caused the roof deck collapse, was already not properly binding to the concrete, in turn allowing water to seep into the building's seams, as early as 1981—barely a year after the mall's original opening. The expansion joint was fixed many times, and fully replaced twice, during the building's lifetime, yet always began tearing away from the concrete again shortly after the repairs were complete.

== 2012 roof collapse ==
Algo Centre Mall roof collapse
- Date: June 23, 2012
- Time: 2:20 pm EDT
- Location: Algo Centre Mall
- Cause: Failure of a weld on a steel connector due to corrosion
- Deaths: 2
- Injuries: 22

At approximately 2:20 pm EDT (1820 GMT) on Saturday, June 23, 2012, part of a 12m x 24m (39'-by-79') segment of the parking deck/roof collapsed at the Algo Centre Mall, sending metal and concrete debris crashing down through two floors of the shopping centre resulting in the deaths of two people and injuring more than 20 people.

Soon after the collapse, the owners arrived at the mall. A representative spoke on behalf of the owner, stating "I'd rather not [comment], because we have talked to our lawyers and we're going to be in the City Hall to represent ourselves. But nevertheless, we are very much concerned [about] this accident."

By approximately 4:00 pm, local authorities alerted the Commissioner of Community Safety, Dan Hefkey. Hefkey called the Toronto-based Heavy Urban Search and Rescue (HUSAR) at 9 pm. The HUSAR crew, after assembling their equipment and travelling the 540 kilometres from Toronto, arrived by 4:25 am Sunday, June 24, and immediately began work.

After initial assessments, the HUSAR team felt they had the proper equipment for the mission. In the early hours of Monday morning, June 25 – and despite discovering signs of life – rescue work was suspended due to the danger of additional concrete falling on the potential survivors and the HUSAR rescuers.

Following the announcement, numerous residents of the town began to sign a list volunteering to enter the structure themselves to continue the search; the owners also announced their intention to seek a court injunction ordering the resumption of search and rescue efforts. After an appeal from local MPP Michael Mantha, whose constituency office was in the mall, Ontario Premier Dalton McGuinty urged rescue workers to resume their search for survivors.

HUSAR later stated that the rescue teams were continuing to strategize alternate methods during the work suspension, and that the local residents and the Premier's call did not influence their actions. Shortly after 10 p.m. on June 25, approximately 19 hours after the initial search was suspended, HUSAR confirmed that it would resume its efforts, including a willingness to employ "drastic measures", including the use of heavy equipment to pull down the unstable escalator structure and part of an external wall from the outside. Prime Minister Stephen Harper also offered the assistance of the Canadian Forces on June 26.

Two bodies were recovered from the debris on Wednesday, June 27—four days after the collapse.

The area which collapsed included two kiosks. The deceased had been a lottery kiosk employee and her customer. Lucie Aylwin, 37, worked just once a week at the lottery booth, earning extra money for her wedding. Aylwin held a full-time job with Collège Boréal, a French language college, as an employment consultant and recruiter in the college's 'Employment Options Emploi' office, located elsewhere in the Algo Centre Mall. Doloris Perizzolo, 74, was a widow and mother believed to be opening pull-tab lottery tickets, which must be opened in view of the booth operator. After the bodies of the two victims were retrieved, and HUSAR confirmed no other victims were trapped in the rubble, efforts shifted to official investigations.

== Investigation ==
On March 8, 2013, the engineering firm NORR, commissioned by the Ontario Provincial Police, released the results of their forensic engineering investigation to the Elliot Lake Inquiry. The investigation found that the collapse was caused by a two-stage failure of the welding on a connection, due to extensive corrosion. The corrosion was caused by improper waterproofing and the placement of a parking lot on the roof, which allowed water, contaminated with road salt, (which accelerated the corrosion) to corrode the structure.

=== Oversights and cost-cutting during planning stages ===
The report states that there were two critical errors made during the planning stages. Firstly, the parking lot for the mall was located on the roof of the building without there being sound waterproofing, and secondly the structural inefficiency of the hollow-core slabs (HCS) which prevented the installation of effective waterproofing later on.

John Kadlec of Beta Engineering originally planned the use of 8-inch HCS, which he specified could withstand 120 pounds per square foot, a load which exceeded specifications on all 8-inch HCS. During the bidding process, the owners were advised by a bidder, Precon, that the specified load could not be handled by the HCS without reinforcements from a composite concrete topping. However, Kadlec advised the owners that the plans called for 8-inch HCS which could withstand the load without reinforcement from topping. The contract was thus awarded to Coreslab, despite Coreslab's design tables indicating that the specified project loads were 38% higher than the maximum load. In 1992, over a decade after the mall's construction, Coreslab retracted the claim to be able to support the load without the use of a composite topping.

Two different waterproofing systems were proposed to the owner by Harry S. Peterson Co. The first system called for a rubberized asphalt membrane to be applied over the non-composite concrete topping, while the second one called for no membrane, and simply controlling leaks with a polyurethane sealant. The second system reduced initial building costs by $136,000. HSP argued strongly for the second option, and convinced the owner to install the second system. The report called this system "intrinsically flawed", and leaks were noticed immediately after construction.

=== Leaking ===
Leaks were noticed immediately after the installation of the topping. Harry S. Peterson Co. attempted many times to fix the leaks. In 1991, the owners contracted Trow to investigate the chronic leaking and find a solution. Two options were provided, but upon consulting with Coreslab, it was determined that neither plan could go forward due to the HCS not being able to support additional loads.

These leaks allowed water to seep through the topping and access the steel frame of the building. This corroded much of the building's frame during the mall's three decades in operation. The corrosion was eventually so severe that the weld on a connection failed, resulting in the collapse.

=== Inquiry ===
A public inquiry was established on July 19, 2012, by the Government of Ontario. The inquiry itself started March 4, 2013. As part of the inquiry, portions of a 700-page engineering report (NORR report) into the collapse were made public.

John Kadlec, a consulting engineer on the original construction, has testified that he raised concerns at the time about sloppy workmanship and inadequate construction materials at the site, including structural columns that were already crooked, steel beams that were already rusting despite being new, and the fateful decision to place the complex's parking area on the roof. According to Kadlec, the construction company opted to resolve the structural issues not by redoing the construction, but by anchoring the building's back wall to the rock outcropping behind it. James Keywan, the building's original architect, testified that he also strongly objected to the rooftop parking, but had little choice once Algocen made their decision to proceed with that plan.

The son of the mall's owner admitted that the company had pressured engineers to remove information on leaks and corrosion from a report and that fictional repair invoices from a shell company, Empire Roofing and Restoration, were used to mislead mortgage holder Royal Bank of Canada about the building's condition.

Speakers at the inquiry have also testified that a significant volume of city traffic regularly cut across the roof deck as a bypass of the traffic lights at the corner of Hillside Drive and Ontario Avenue, resulting in more stress on the structure than it had been designed to handle. The NORR report speculated that a heavy vehicle might have contributed to a previously undetected partial failure of the support structure a few months prior to the final collapse.

The inquiry also found that while Perizzolo died almost instantly, Aylwin may have survived for up to 39 hours after the collapse, and may have been found alive if HUSAR had not suspended its rescue operations.

== Aftermath ==
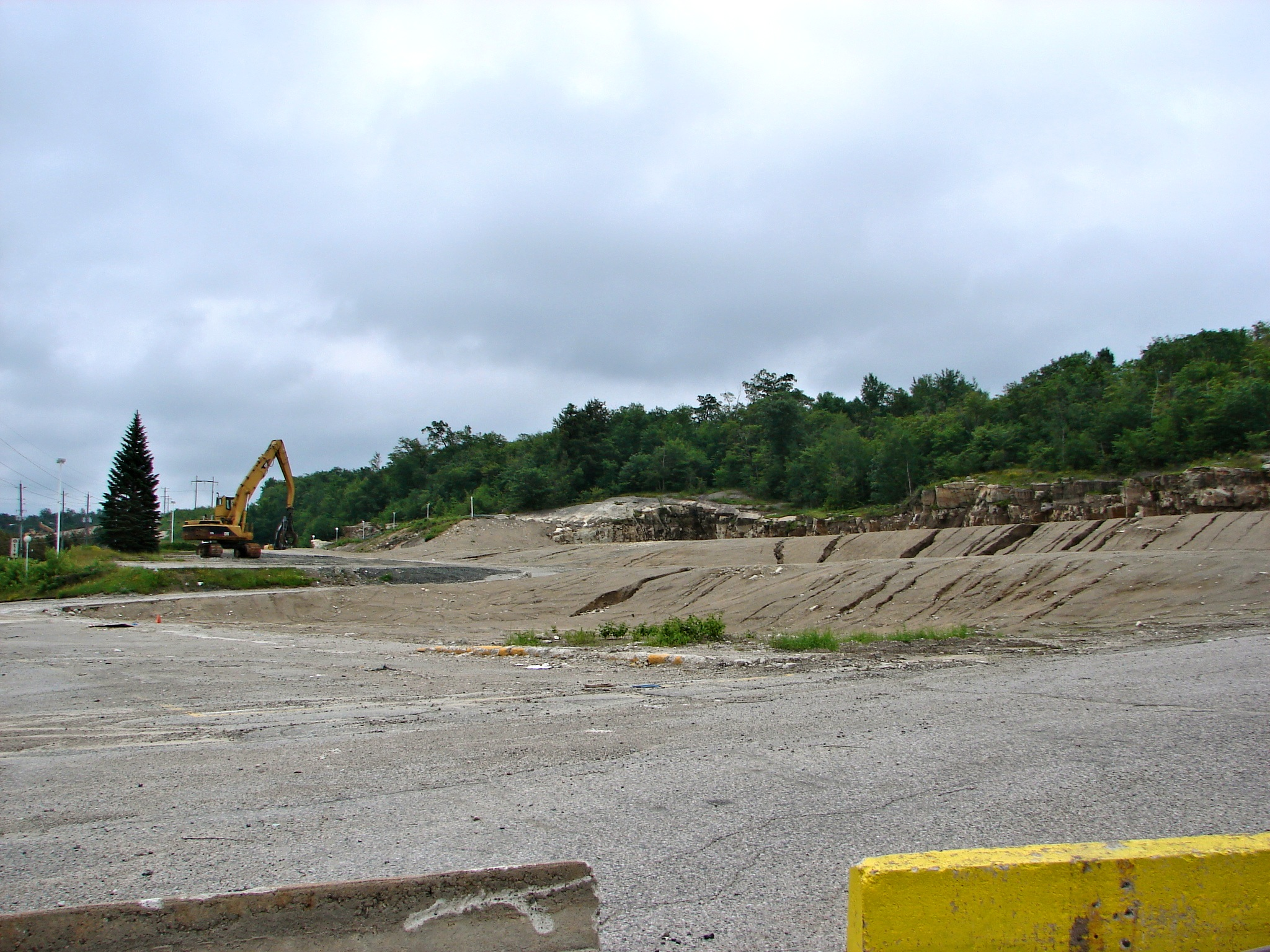
By spring 2013, the entire facility had been demolished.

As of the end of June, the economic impact of Algo Centre's closure was unknown, but described by Mayor Rick Hamilton as "huge". Estimates suggest 250 people worked at the mall or hotel. The nearest significant cities to Elliot Lake are Sudbury and Sault Ste. Marie, both over 100 kilometres away by road; residents were said to be fielding requests from others for essentials like clothing, not readily available without the mall. Apart from the mall's Foodland store, there is only one other grocery store, Lyle's No Frills, in the city; that store and a nearby video store quickly made efforts to expand their merchandise selections to include some clothing items.

The Elliot Lake & District Chamber of Commerce has established a committee to help retailers from the building; at one meeting, Premier McGuinty assured that they'd remove rigid program requirements for assistance programs. The East Algoma Community Futures Development Corporation approved interest free "transitional loans" of up to $25,000 for affected businesses. TD Bank's local branch contributed $10,000 to the Elliot Lake Food Bank. Foodland announced it will rebuild, and pay employees up to six months wages during the process.

Mall owner Nazarian received death threats, which pushed him into hiding, and a class action lawsuit had already been launched by June 28, according to his lawyer. The class action lawsuit was launched by the owners of the Hungry Jack's franchise in the mall. The lawsuit lists as defendants Algo Centre Mall, Eastwood Mall Inc., Robert Nazarian, the City of Elliot Lake, the province of Ontario, and the unnamed engineer "who approved the structure of the mall a short time prior to this incident."

Foodland leased the city's Collins Hall recreational facility for conversion into a temporary grocery store, which opened in October 2012. Foodland's permanent new store opened at Pearson Plaza on April 1, 2016; the Collins Hall facility (W.H. Collins Centre) was then converted back to recreational use, with several of the chain's structural improvements to the building—including upgrades to the lighting system and improvements to the building's accessibility for people with disabilities—remaining in place as a donation to the city.

The public library branch and some government offices that had been located at the mall were temporarily relocated to the former White Mountain Academy of the Arts. The library moved to Pearson Plaza, and Service Canada relocated to Kilborn Way and Highway 108.

=== Government reaction ===
The province ordered a review of both HUSAR and Emergency Management Ontario.

The collapse focused attention on the Harper government's cancellation of the Joint Emergency Preparedness Program, which provides funds to Canada's five HUSAR teams. The province and the National Fire Protection Association denounced the cuts. The Canadian Centre for Emergency Preparedness suggested that such cuts would necessitate Canada asking for assistance from the United States in similar situations. Also cancelled by the Conservative federal government was the Canadian Emergency Management College, established in 1954 to train first responders. A spokesperson for Public Safety Minister Vic Toews deflected criticism of the cuts, noting that 90 per cent of emergencies are managed municipally or provincially.

Global News reporter Jennifer Tryon attempted to file a Freedom of Information request for documents on June 29, but was refused; an employee came out from the back of the offices, and turned the City Clerk's chair around, so that they couldn't respond. City officials then called the OPP. After the request, the city issued a two line statement that documents are now part of investigations. OPP noted that the documents are still available through Freedom of Information requests, and that the situation likely didn't warrant an emergency call to police. The reporter was provided a FOI application on police arrival, and told to ignore instructions from their superiors on calling police. Tryon, producer Kieron O'Dea and cameraman Trevor Owens would later receive a Canadian Screen Award nomination for Breaking National News Reportage at the 1st Canadian Screen Awards.

=== Demolition ===
Following the collapse, concerns were raised that Algo Centre Mall may contain asbestos which may have been released during the collapse and rescue demolition of the mall. Further concerns were raised about non-fungible items trapped in the debris; John Pomerleau, the owner of Alternative Funeral Service which is located in the Algo Centre Mall stated that more than 30 cremation urns were still trapped in the mall and it was unknown if or when they could be recovered.

Local area MPP Michael Mantha raised concerns that confidential records must be extracted, such as those from the public health department. He expressed concern that the information might end up in the local landfill. Documents were never extracted from Algo Mall.

Many health, social assistance and Service Canada files were found at the city landfill. Documents found among the rubble by a private source said to be photocopies of clients drivers licences, social insurance numbers, health cards and birth certificates. The private source never removed any documents from the landfill site, although it is unknown if anyone else entered the landfill site after hours while the demolition was progressing.

=== Political and professional impacts ===
The inquiry's final report was released just 12 days before the 2014 municipal election. Ongoing anger over city council's handling of the Algo Centre Mall resulted in incumbent mayor Rick Hamilton and two incumbent city councillors who ran against him for the mayoralty being defeated by political newcomer Dan Marchisella, and only one seat on city council was won by an incumbent councillor.

Both Professional Engineers Ontario (PEO) and Ontario Association of Certified Engineering Technicians and Technologists (OACETT) have implemented mandatory Continuing Professional Development programs in response to the Algo collapse.

== Criminal trial ==
Robert G.H. Wood, the engineer who signed off on the engineering report declaring the mall structurally sound just a few weeks before the roof collapse, was indicted on July 11, 2015, with two counts of criminal negligence causing death and one count of criminal negligence causing bodily harm. According to the inquiry, Wood had previously indicated in conversation that he was aware that the roof was at risk of caving in, but altered his final report at Nazarian's request so that the structural issues did not jeopardize the building's refinancing. Furthermore, Wood's engineering licence was already suspended when he performed the inspection, and his licence was then revoked.

=== Verdict ===
In June 2017, Justice Edward E. Gareau of the Ontario Superior Court found that there was not enough evidence to find Wood guilty beyond reasonable doubt.

In explaining the verdict, the judge relied on the fact that other engineers had inspected the premises and also failed to accurately assess that the mall was structurally unsafe. He noted that while a judgement that the structure was safe would be "poor judgment", the crown's lead expert (the author of the NORR report Dr. Hassan Saffarini), admitted to the judge that such a judgement could be "conceivable".

In his evidence, the Crown's lead expert, Dr. Hassan Saffarini testified that an engineer who saw the condition and level of corrosion in the Algo Centre Mall could have still reached the professional judgment that the mall was safe. Although this judgment would be "poor judgment", in the words of Dr. Saffarini, I conclude from the evidence of Dr. Saffarini that it would not be an act or omission that reflects an unrestrained disregard for the consequences. In other words, the actions do not elevate to a marked and substantial departure from what a reasonable engineer would do in the same circumstances.

— J. Gareau

In closing, the judge stated that Wood must accept a moral responsibility for the events that unfolded on June 23, 2012. He stated that Mr. Wood's work was "shoddy, sloppy and even inadequate", but that it "did not reach the level of being criminal". He also levelled criticism at the officials of the City of Elliot Lake who did not exercise sufficient vigilance as well as Bob Nazarian, whom the judge called "a neglectful, greedy owner who minimized problems and put cost ahead of people in remedying deficiencies in the mall".

== New mall ==
Elliot Lake was supposed to build a new shopping mall yet only a plaza would be built, given the name Pearson Plaza. It was built less than a kilometre south of Algo Centre Mall, on the site of the former Nordic Hotel (later Huron Lodge) at Hillside Drive South and Ontario Avenue. The first store in the new plaza officially opened on April 1, 2016.
