= Elliot Lake =

- City (single-tier)
- City of Elliot Lake
- The city of Elliot Lake; the lake on the right

- Location in Ontario
- Coordinates: 46°23′N 82°39′W
- Country: Canada
- Province: Ontario
- District: Algoma
- Established: 1955

Government
  - Mayor: Andrew Wannan
  - Governing Body: Elliot Lake City Council
  - Federal electoral district: Sault Ste. Marie—Algoma
  - Provincial electoral district: Algoma—Manitoulin

Area
  - Land: 696.06 km^{2} (268.75 sq mi)

Population (2021)
  - Total: 11,372
  - Density: 16.3/km^{2} (42/sq mi)
- Time zone: UTC-5 (Eastern Standard Time (EST))
  - Summer (DST): UTC-4 (Eastern Daylight Time (EDT))
- Forward sortation area: P5A
- Area codes: 705, 249
- Highways: Highway 108
- Website: cityofelliotlake.com
- Municipal rank: 325th in Canada

Elliot Lake is a city in Algoma District, Ontario, Canada. It is north of Lake Huron, midway between the cities of Sudbury and Sault Ste. Marie in the Northern Ontario region. Once dubbed the "uranium capital of the world," Elliot Lake has since diversified to a hub for advanced manufacturing, forest harvesting, mine reclamation expertise, retirement living, all-season tourism and remote work. The nearby Mississagi Provincial Park is one of only ten operating parks in Ontario with back country hiking and camping, and is the eighth-largest hiking network in Ontario among all operating parks.

== History ==
Prior to the settlement of the city, a seasonal Ojibwa village extended along the lake's shoreline near the present hospital.

The town takes its name from the lake. There is no official record of origin of name; the earliest appearance is on the Dominion map of 1901. Folklore suggest it was named for a logging camp cook who drowned in the lake. The townsite name was approved on August 14, 1952. Elliot Lake was incorporated as a city in 1990.

=== Uranium mining ===
The city was established as a planned community for the mining industry in 1955 after the discovery of uranium in the area, and named after the small lake on its northern edge. By the late 1950s, its population had grown to about 25,000. It was originally incorporated as an improvement district. Geologist Franc Joubin and American financier Joseph Hirshhorn were instrumental in its founding. The principal mining companies were Denison Mines and Rio Algom. The population has varied with several boom-and-bust cycles from the 1950s to the 1990s, from a high of over 26,000 to a low of about 6,600.

By 1958 it was apparent that world production of uranium was far outstripping demand and Canadian producers received unofficial notice that US options on Canadian uranium production between 1962 and 1966 would not be exercised. This was confirmed in 1959.

During the 1970s, federal plans for CANDU Reactors and Ontario Hydro's interest in atomic energy led the town, anticipating a population of 30,000, to expand again. However, by the early 1990s depleted reserves and low prices caused the last mines in the area to close.

==== Area uranium mines ====
- Stanleigh Mine (1956–1960 and 1982–1997), operated by Rio Algom Ltd., produced 14 million tons of ore.
- Spanish American Mine (1957–1959), operated by Rio Algom Ltd., produced 79,000 tons of ore.
- Can-Met Mine (1957–1960), operated by Denison Mines Ltd., produced 2.6 million tons of ore.
- Milliken Mine (1957–1964), operated by Rio Algom Ltd., produced 6.3 million tons of ore.
- Panel Mine (1957–1961 and 1978–1990), operated by Rio Algom Ltd., produced 15 million tons of ore.
- Denison Mine (1957–1992), operated by Denison Mines Ltd., produced 69 million tons of ore.
- Stanrock Mine (1958–1960 and 1964–1985), operated by Denison Mines Ltd., produced 6.4 million tons of ore.
- Quirke Mine(s) (1955–1961 and 1965–1990), operated by Rio Algom Ltd., produced 44 million tons of ore.
- Pronto Mine (1955–1970), operated by Rio Algom Ltd., produced 2.3 million tons of ore.
- Buckles Mine (1956–1960), operated by Rio Algom Ltd., produced 276,000 tons of ore.
- Lacnor Mine "Lake Nordic" (1956–1960), operated by Rio Algom Ltd., produced 3.4 million tons of ore.
- Nordic Mine (1956–1970), operated by Rio Algom Ltd., produced 13 million tons of ore

==== Mining legacy health and environmental concerns ====
In 1974, after growing concern from uranium miners about lung cancer and a lack of support from mine owners for sick workers, 1,000 uranium miners staged a wildcat strike. The 14-day strike triggered a chain of events that led to the creation of a Royal Commission on the Health and Safety of Workers in Mines (informally known as the Ham Commission) which subsequently led to the creation of the Canada's Occupational Health and Safety Act of 1979.

According to University of Toronto history professor Laurel Sefton MacDowell in her 2012 article 'The Elliot Lake Uranium Miners’ Battle to Gain Occupational Health and Safety Improvements, 1950–1980', the health concerns over radiation in the local environment are perpetual, and must be monitored perpetually.

The 2017 performance of Rio Algom Limited (a subsidiary of BHP), which owns nine of the decommissioned mines, was described as "below expectations" by the Canadian Nuclear Safety Commission. Canadian Nuclear Safety Commission reported radium releases above limits at the Stanleigh effluent treatment plant, prompting engineering work plus increased site monitoring by the owners.

=== Post-mining ===
In the years following the cessation of mining, the city looked elsewhere for its survival, finding some success promoting itself as a retirement community, advanced manufacturing hub and tourist destination.

On June 23, 2012, part of a roof collapsed at Algo Centre Mall, sending metal and concrete debris crashing down through two floors of the shopping centre. The accident killed two people. Pearson Plaza has since opened.

On February 21, 2019, part of the theatre roof of the Lester B. Pearson Civic Centre collapsed due to an abnormally heavy snow load. The building has since been completely demolished.

Today, the economy of Elliot Lake has seen steady growth. Major employers in Elliot Lake include major mining services firms such as Komatsu, Weir, and Denison Environmental; specialty manufacturing organizations such as St. Regis Group, HiRail Leasing and Prestige Pulpits; numerous forestry businesses; a collection of professional services offices such as Cambridge Law LLP, KPMG and BrokerLink and an increasing number of technology organizations. Government organizations found in the community are numerous and include the City of Elliot Lake, Elliot Lake Retirement Living, a range of Ontario Ministries, a set of federal government offices, a hospital, many health service providers and several schools.

The city has four major retail areas: Downtown, Highway 108 Corridor, Hillside, and Paris; and two industrial parks, located at north and south ends of the City. The new mall is Pearson Plaza, and opened downtown in 2016.

In January 2023, just weeks after being elected in the 2022 Algoma District municipal elections, mayor Chris Patrie was removed from office in a ruling that he had violated municipal conflict of interest rules by lobbying, in his prior term as a city councillor, to have the city's new recreation centre built near the Oakland Plaza, in which he is a part owner, instead of on the former Algo Centre Mall site. Deputy mayor Andrew Wannan served as acting mayor, while Patrie appealed the ruling. Patrie lost his appeal, and Wannan was elevated to the full mayoralty by the city council in February 2024.

== Geography and environment ==
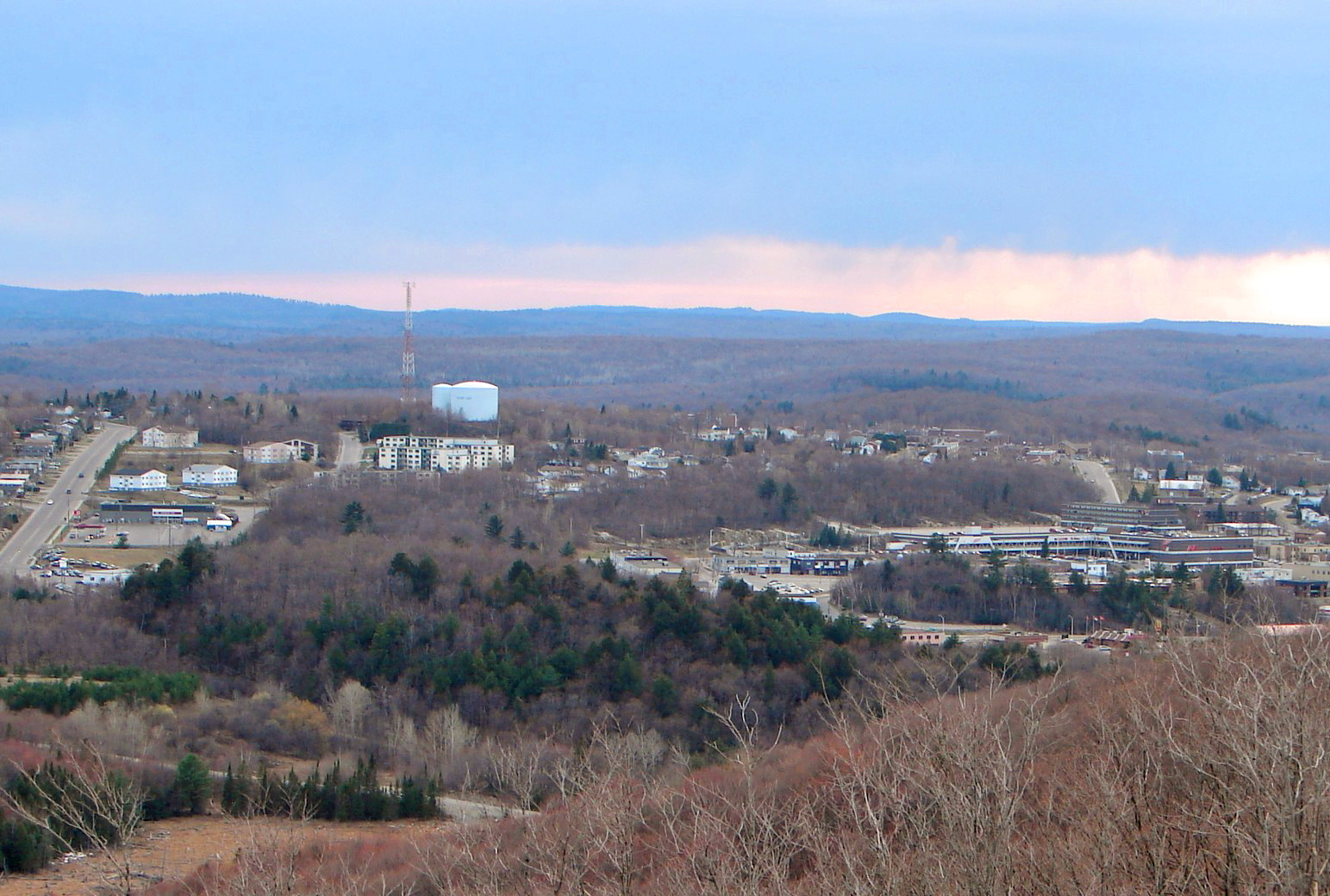
Elliot Lake seen from the Fire Tower Lookout

Situated on the Canadian Shield, the city is surrounded by dense forest, muskeg swamps, numerous lakes, winding rivers, and hills of Precambrian bedrock. The local forests are mixed deciduous and coniferous, with colourful displays in the autumn.

Local wildlife include moose, white-tailed deer, American black bear, beaver, loon, muskrat, otter, Canada goose, and lynx, to name but a few. Fish species include lake trout, speckled trout, rainbow trout, smallmouth bass, pickerel (walleye), and sturgeon.

Since December 1990 the town has been home to the Elliot Lake Research Field Station, established by Laurentian University to investigate environmental radioactivity.

Acclaimed Canadian photographer Edward Burtynsky has taken landscape pictures of uranium and nickel tailings during the mid-1990s, providing evidence of the after-effects to the ecosystem.

=== Climate ===
Elliot Lake has a humid continental climate (Dfb). Summers are warm and rainy with cool nights. Winters are long and very cold with extremely heavy snowfall. Precipitation is very heavy year round for such a cold location.

Climate data for Elliot Lake Airport (1981–2010)
Month	Jan	Feb	Mar	Apr	May	Jun	Jul	Aug	Sep	Oct	Nov	Dec	Year
Record high humidex	6.2	10.0	18.0	32.1	36.0	44.0	42.3	43.0	36.2	32.2	18.5	10.1	44.0
Record high °C (°F)	8.0 (46.4)	10.0 (50.0)	17.8 (64.0)	25.5 (77.9)	31.2 (88.2)	32.4 (90.3)	34.0 (93.2)	34.5 (94.1)	30.9 (87.6)	25.4 (77.7)	18.0 (64.4)	13.0 (55.4)	34.5 (94.1)
Mean daily maximum °C (°F)	−6.2 (20.8)	−3.7 (25.3)	1.7 (35.1)	9.8 (49.6)	16.7 (62.1)	22.1 (71.8)	24.0 (75.2)	23.2 (73.8)	18.6 (65.5)	10.8 (51.4)	3.6 (38.5)	−3 (27)	9.8 (49.6)
Daily mean °C (°F)	−10.9 (12.4)	−8.8 (16.2)	−3.6 (25.5)	4.5 (40.1)	11.1 (52.0)	16.5 (61.7)	18.6 (65.5)	17.8 (64.0)	13.5 (56.3)	6.5 (43.7)	0.1 (32.2)	−7 (19)	4.9 (40.8)
Mean daily minimum °C (°F)	−15.6 (3.9)	−13.8 (7.2)	−8.8 (16.2)	−0.8 (30.6)	5.4 (41.7)	10.8 (51.4)	13.1 (55.6)	12.3 (54.1)	8.4 (47.1)	2.1 (35.8)	−3.4 (25.9)	−10.9 (12.4)	−0.1 (31.8)
Record low °C (°F)	−37 (−35)	−33 (−27)	−32 (−26)	−15 (5)	−6 (21)	−1 (30)	4.0 (39.2)	4.0 (39.2)	−5.5 (22.1)	−9 (16)	−21 (−6)	−32.6 (−26.7)	−37 (−35)
Record low wind chill	−44.6	−40.3	−33	−23.3	−9.1	0.0	0.0	0.0	−6.3	−12.7	−30.5	−42.8	−44.6
Average precipitation mm (inches)	66.4 (2.61)	49.8 (1.96)	63.0 (2.48)	73.1 (2.88)	84.9 (3.34)	84.9 (3.34)	86.4 (3.40)	101.7 (4.00)	102.0 (4.02)	110.5 (4.35)	92.8 (3.65)	93.2 (3.67)	1,008.8 (39.72)
Average rainfall mm (inches)	17.9 (0.70)	9.7 (0.38)	31.3 (1.23)	62.0 (2.44)	84.4 (3.32)	84.9 (3.34)	86.4 (3.40)	101.7 (4.00)	102.0 (4.02)	107.1 (4.22)	67.7 (2.67)	27.6 (1.09)	782.7 (30.81)
Average snowfall cm (inches)	62.1 (24.4)	48.7 (19.2)	35.1 (13.8)	10.6 (4.2)	0.61 (0.24)	0.0 (0.0)	0.0 (0.0)	0.0 (0.0)	0.0 (0.0)	2.5 (1.0)	23.4 (9.2)	76.0 (29.9)	259.0 (102.0)
Average precipitation days (≥ 0.2 mm)	12.2	10.5	8.8	9.5	11.5	11.9	10.6	10.2	11.8	13.3	12.3	14.6	137.3
Average rainy days (≥ 0.2 mm)	2.0	1.7	3.6	7.7	11.3	11.9	10.6	10.2	11.8	12.9	8.0	3.3	95.1
Average snowy days (≥ 0.2 cm)	11.4	9.8	6.4	2.9	0.29	0.0	0.0	0.0	0.0	0.75	5.4	13.1	50.0
Average relative humidity (%)	81.0	77.0	66.5	55.0	51.1	55.1	56.5	57.4	61.0	64.1	76.7	82.3	65.3
Source: Environment Canada

== Demographics ==
In the 2021 Census of Population conducted by Statistics Canada, Elliot Lake had a population of 11,372 living in 5,839 of its 6,275 total private dwellings, a change of 5.9% from its 2016 population of 10,741. With a land area of 696.06 km^{2} (268.75 sq mi), it had a population density of 16.3/km^{2} (42.3/sq mi) in 2021.

Canada census – Elliot Lake community profile

	2021	2016	2011
Population	11,372 (+5.9% from 2016)	10,741 (−5.3% from 2011)	11,348 (−1.7% from 2006)
Land area	696.06 km^{2} (268.75 sq mi)	714.65 km^{2} (275.93 sq mi)	714.56 km^{2} (275.89 sq mi)
Population density	16.3/km^{2} (42/sq mi)	15.0/km^{2} (39/sq mi)	15.9/km^{2} (41/sq mi)
Median age	60.4 (M: 60.0, F: 61.2)		57.1 (M: 56.5, F: 57.6)
Private dwellings	6,275 (total) 5,839 (occupied)	6259 (total)	6245 (total)
Median household income	$50,000

References: 2021 2016 2011

Historical populations

Year	Pop.	±%
1956	3,791	—
1961	13,179	+247.6%
1966	7,014	−46.8%
1971	9,093	+29.6%
1976	8,849	−2.7%
1981	16,723	+89.0%
1986	17,984	+7.5%

Year	Pop.	±%
1991	14,089	−21.7%
1996	13,588	−3.6%
2001	11,956	−12.0%
2006	11,549	−3.4%
2011	11,348	−1.7%
2016	10,741	−5.3%
2021	11,372	+5.9%

Source: Statistics Canada

== Politics ==
The city is within the Sault Ste. Marie—Algoma federal riding, represented by Liberal Member of Parliament, Terry Sheehan. Provincially, the city is within the Algoma—Manitoulin electoral district, represented by Progressive Conservative Member of Provincial Parliament, Bill Rosenberg.

=== Municipal government ===
From its establishment in 1955 until 1966, Elliot Lake was governed as an improvement district, a type of local government committee (no longer used in Ontario) to oversee developing communities that need some form of administration but have not yet met the criteria necessary to be formally incorporated as a town. It was incorporated as a town in 1966, and reincorporated as a city in 1990.

In January 2023, just weeks after being elected in the 2022 Algoma District municipal elections, mayor Chris Patrie was removed from office in a ruling that he had violated municipal conflict of interest rules by lobbying, in his prior term as a city councillor, to have the city's new recreation centre built near the Oakland Plaza, in which he is a part owner, instead of on the former Algo Centre Mall site. Deputy mayor Andrew Wannan served as acting mayor, while Patrie appealed the ruling. Patrie lost his appeal, and Wannan was elevated to the full mayoralty by the city council in February 2024. Patrie was barred from holding office for two years and ordered to pay $101,000 (CAD) in legal costs to the city's integrity commissioner.

As an improvement district, the city was chaired by the following:

- F. R. Joubin - 1955-1957
- R. C. Hart - 1957-1961
- Edward Futterer - 1961-1966

Its reeves and mayors since incorporation have been:

- Charles Stewart - 1966-1968
- Alcide Alemany - 1968-1970
- Roger Taylor - 1970-1988
- George Farkouh - 1988-2006
- Rick Hamilton - 2006-2014
- Dan Marchisella - 2014-2022
- Chris Patrie - 2022-2023
- Andrew Wannan - 2024-present

== Arts and culture ==
Local festivals include the Jewel in the Wilderness Festival, Heritage Weekend and the Elliot Lake Arts on the Trail festival.

The city is home to Denison House, a hotel and convention facility located in the former corporate lodge of Denison Mines, and the Elliot Lake Mining and Nuclear Museum. Two community monuments, the Uranium Atom Monument downtown and the Miners Memorial Monument on Horne Lake, are also found in the city, as well as a scenic lookout at the former fire tower.

In 1975, Canadian musician Stompin' Tom Connors recorded "Damn Good Song for a Miner," about the city of Elliot Lake and its mining culture in the 1960s. Elliot Lake is also a prominent setting in Alistair MacLeod's award-winning novel No Great Mischief.

== Tourist attractions ==
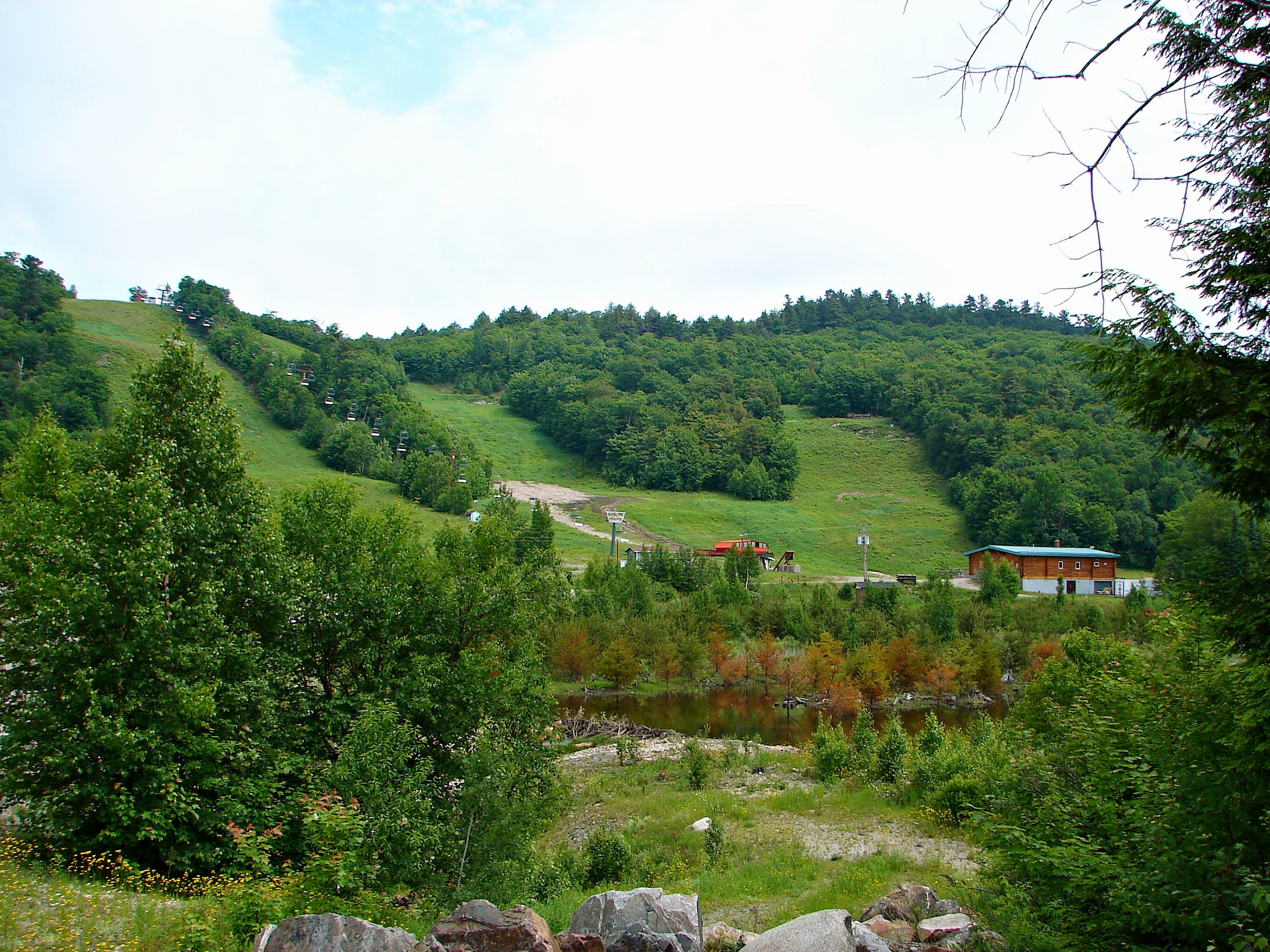
Mount Dufour ski hill

- The Elliot Lake fire tower lookout overlooks the city
- Mississagi Provincial Park
- Sheriff Creek Wildlife Sanctuary
- Voyageur's Trail & Westview Hiking Trails
- Spruce and Spine Beaches
- Bob Stirling XC Ski and Mountain Bike Trails on the shore of Elliot Lake
- Deer Trail Colours Tour
- Rawhide Lake Conservation Area / Our Colleagues Area
- Events (Arts on the Trail, Uranium Heritage Days, 5K Run and others)
- Mount Dufour – Ski area with 2 lifts and 7 trails, 320 feet (98 m) vertical and 100% snowmaking capability
- Elliot Lake Museum
- Motorized Sports

== Sports ==
- Elliot Lake ATV Club
- Stone Ridge Golf & Country Club
- Mount Dufour Ski Area
- Mountain Bike Ontario Cup Race
- The Jewel in the Wilderness Ontario Cup Road Race
- Tri-it in the Wilderness Triathlon
- Bell Ididarace Sled Dog Race
- Deer Trail Scenic Touring Route
- Elliot Lake Tennis Club
- Voyageur Hiking Trail

=== Ice hockey ===
The city is home to the Elliot Lake Vikings of the Northern Ontario Junior Hockey League (NOJHL). The league placed the team on an indefinite leave of absence in December 2024 due to the protracted closure of Rogers Arena, the team's official home in Elliot Lake. The team was forced to vacate the building, which is owned by the city, due to "structural concerns" at the beginning of the 2023–24 season. As a temporary solution, the team relocated to the Massey and District Community Centre some 45 miles (72 km) away in Blind River. In December 2024, after the Elliot Lake city council delayed the reopening of its arena, the league placed the Vikings on leave for the rest of the 2024–25 season. In May 2025, the Vikings extending its leave of absence through the 2025–26 season.

In March of 2024 Elliot Lake was named the winner of the 2024 iteration of the Kraft Hockeyville contest after winning a nationwide vote. The other nominees were Enderby, British Columbia; Cochrane, Alberta; and Wolseley, Saskatchewan. As winners they received $250,000 towards repairs at Rogers Arena (formerly known as Centennial Arena) and the right to host an NHL preseason game in the fall of 2024. The NHL Preseason game took place on September 29th at the Sudbury Community Arena in Sudbury, ON. The game saw the Ottawa Senators play the Pittsburgh Penguins in a preseason game which ended in a 5-2 victory for the Penguins. The game featured goals by Nick Cousins, Tim Stützle, Sidney Crosby and a Hat Trick by Evgeni Malkin.

=== Baseball ===
- Elliot Lake Fireside Heat
- Elliot Lake Minor Fastball Association

=== Martial Arts ===
- Korean Martial Arts Centre (KMAC)
- Hapkido Kids Inc.

=== Softball ===
- Elliot Lake Mixed Slow-pitch (Adult)
- Elliot Lake Mixed Slow-pitch (Youth)
- Elliot Lake Ladies Slow-Pitch (Adult)

=== Swimming ===
- Elliot Lake Aquatic Club (ELAC)

== Transportation ==
Relatively isolated, Elliot Lake is connected to the south only by Highway 108, a 30 km distance to Highway 17, also known as the Trans-Canada Highway. North of the city, Highway 639 extends for 24 kilometres to its terminus at Highway 546, an almost entirely unpopulated route used primarily as an access road to Mississagi Provincial Park and a few private wilderness recreation lodges. The Deer Trail Route, a part of the Ontario Tourist Route network, follows a circle consisting of Highways 17, 108, 639 and 546.

A 1991 study by the Ontario Ministry of Transportation proposed the extension of Highway 555 (Granary Lake Road) from Blind River to meet Spine Road in Elliot Lake, creating a new route which would reduce the length of a commute between the two communities by approximately 20 kilometres. Although the ministry has announced no firm plans to construct the proposed road, Elliot Lake City Council passed a motion in August 2015 calling for the project's revival.

As a general aviation facility Elliot Lake Municipal Airport has no regularly scheduled flights. The closest scheduled airport with flights are located in Sudbury and Sault Ste. Marie.

Elliot Lake Transit provides hourly bus service except statutory holidays.

Intercity motor coach service is provided by Ontario Northland.

== Education ==
=== Current schools ===
- Elliot Lake Secondary School
- Elliot Lake Intermediate School
- Villa Française-des-Jeunes
- Our Lady of Fatima
- Our Lady of Lourdes
- École Georges-Vanier
- Esten Park Public School
- Central Avenue Public School

==== Defunct postsecondary and adult schools ====
- Sault College (Satellite Campus) – closed
- Collège Boréal (Satellite Campus) – replaced with Access Centre to assist locals in finding employment
- White Mountain Academy of the Arts – closed 2006

== Media ==
=== Print media ===
The Elliot Lake Standard is the city's newspaper, owned by Postmedia. The city is also served by Elliot Lake Today, a community news website operated as part of the Village Media network.

The North Shore Bulletin is the city's bi-weekly advertising flyer, which also prints current news events.

=== Radio ===
Elliot Lake has one commercial radio station, which operates two transmitters due to signal deficiencies in parts of the city. All of its other radio services are rebroadcasters of stations from Sudbury.

Frequency	Call sign	Branding	Format	Owner	Notes
FM 90.3	CBEC-FM	CBC Radio One	Talk radio, public radio	Canadian Broadcasting Corporation	Rebroadcaster of CBCS-FM Sudbury
FM 94.1	CKNR-FM	Moose FM	Adult contemporary	Vista Broadcast Group	
FM 98.7	CKNR-FM-1	Moose FM	Adult contemporary	Vista Broadcast Group	Additional transmitter due to signal deficiencies
FM 101.7	CBON-FM-5	Ici Radio-Canada Première	Talk radio, public radio	Canadian Broadcasting Corporation	Rebroadcaster of CBON-FM Sudbury
FM 102.5	CJTK-FM-3	KFM	Christian music	Harvest Ministries Sudbury	Rebroadcaster of CJTK-FM Sudbury

=== Television ===
OTA channel	Call sign	Network	Notes
3 (VHF)	CICI-TV-1	CTV	Rebroadcaster of CICI-TV Sudbury

Elliot Lake was previously served by CBEC-TV, VHF channel 7, and CBLFT-TV-6, VHF channel 12, which rebroadcast the Toronto-based stations CBLT-DT (CBC Television) and CBLFT-DT (Ici Radio-Canada Télé), respectively. These rebroadcasters were shut down in 2012 due to budget cuts at the Canadian Broadcasting Corporation.

== Notable people ==
- Rick Brebant, hockey player
- Kayt Burgess, writer
- Christine Girard, weightlifter
- Alex Henry, hockey player
- Korey Jarvis, International wrestler
- Suzanne A. Rogers, socialite
- Jeremy Stevenson, hockey player
- Zack Stortini, hockey player
- Alan Thicke, late Canadian-American actor grew up in Elliot Lake

== See also ==
- List of francophone communities in Ontario
