= Plummer Additional =

- Township (single-tier)
- Township of Plummer Additional
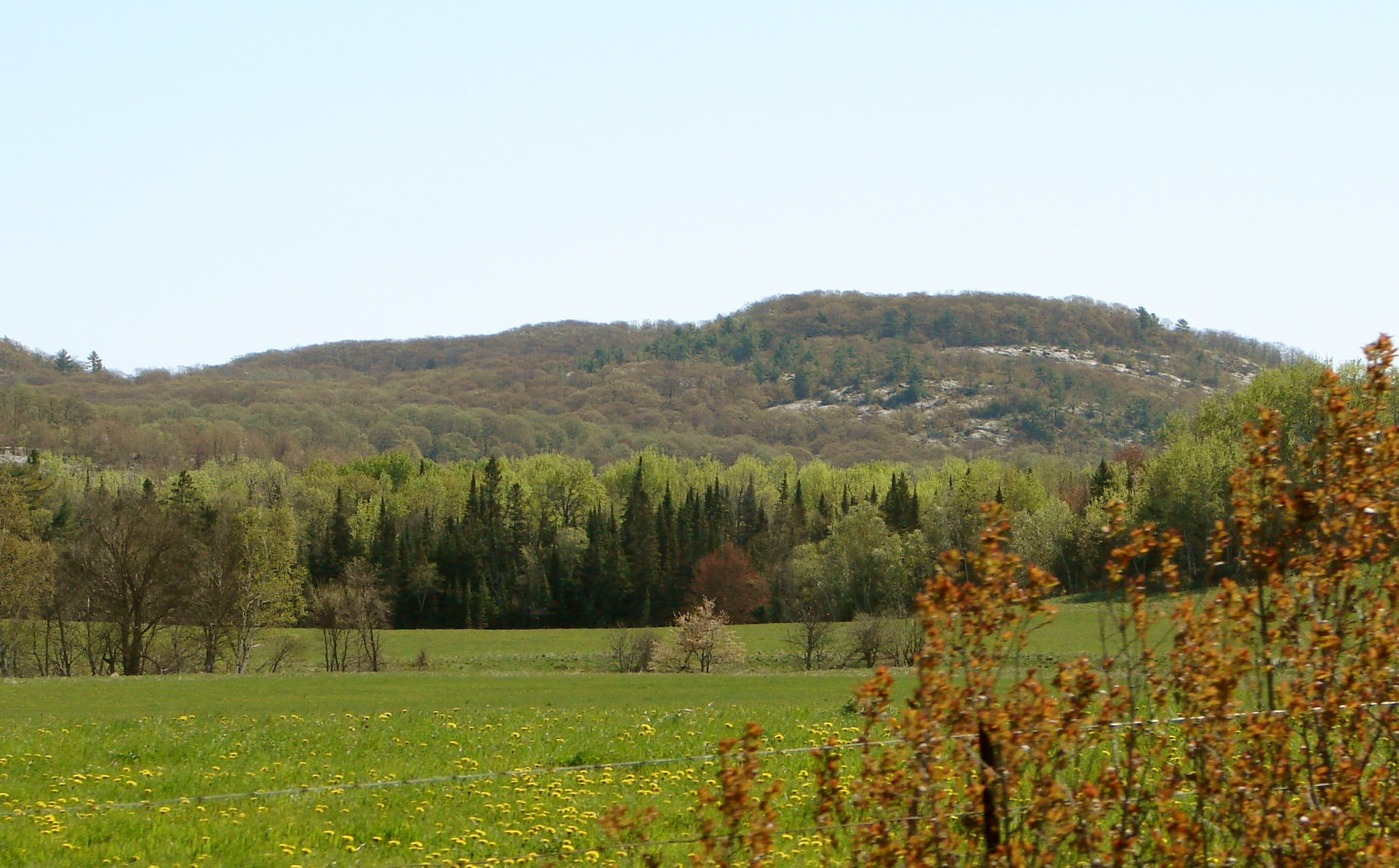
- Countryside at Plummer

- Location within Ontario
- Coordinates: 46°22′N 83°46′W
- Country: Canada
- Province: Ontario
- District: Algoma
- Incorporated: 1891

Government
  - Mayor: Beth West
  - MP: Terry Sheehan (Liberal)
  - MPP: Bill Rosenberg (PC)

Area
  - Land: 219.24 km^{2} (84.65 sq mi)
- Elevation: 242 m (794 ft)

Population (2021)
  - Total: 757
  - Density: 3.5/km^{2} (9.1/sq mi)
- Time zone: UTC-5 (EST)
  - Summer (DST): UTC-4 (EDT)
- Postal Code: P0R 1C0
- Area codes: 705, 249 (785 exchange)
- Website: www.plummertownship.ca

Plummer Additional is a township and single tier municipality located in Algoma District in Northeastern Ontario, Canada. The township had a population of 757 in the 2021 Canadian census.

== Communities ==
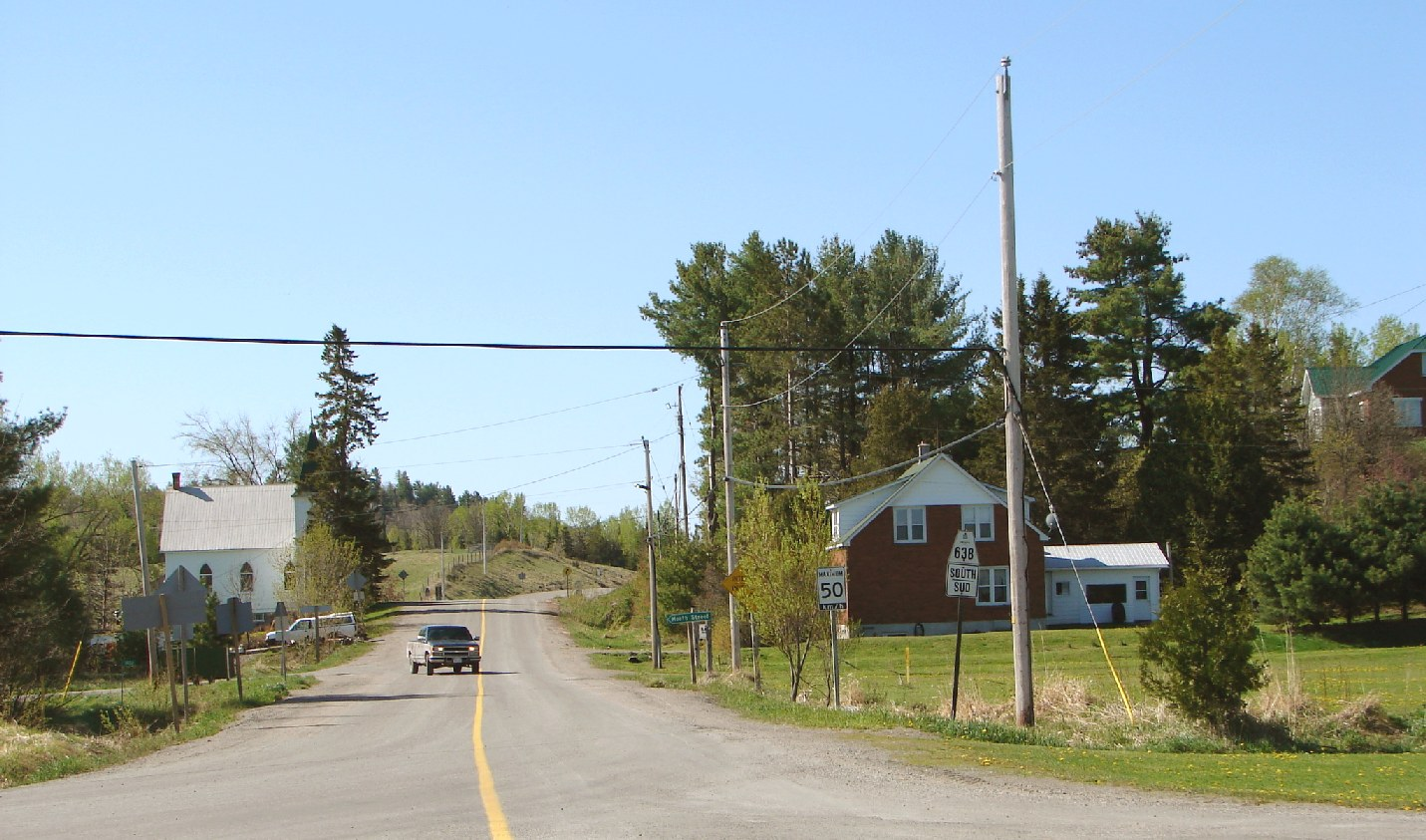
Rydal Bank

The township includes the communities of:

- Bruce Station (46°19′00″N 83°46′03″W)
- Cloudslee (46°19′25″N 83°42′19″W)
- Plummer (46°24′30″N 83°48′34″W)
- Rock Lake (46°27′09″N 83°47′07″W)
- Rydal Bank (46°21′46″N 83°44′34″W)

The town of Bruce Mines is wholly surrounded by, but politically independent of, the township; it was separated in 1903. However, the 2010 mayoral election in Bruce Mines was won by Gordon Post, a candidate who pledged to investigate the feasibility of reamalgamating the two municipalities.

== History ==
Rydal Bank Church located at Rydal Bank within the township is a municipally designated heritage site.

== Demographics ==
In the 2021 Census of Population conducted by Statistics Canada, Plummer Additional had a population of 757 living in 328 of its 519 total private dwellings, a change of 14.7% from its 2016 population of 660. With a land area of 219.24 km^{2} (84.65 sq mi), it had a population density of 3.5/km^{2} (8.9/sq mi) in 2021.

Canada census – Plummer Additional community profile

	2021	2016	2011
Population	757 (+14.7% from 2016)	660 (1.5% from 2011)	650 (4.0% from 2006)
Land area	219.24 km^{2} (84.65 sq mi)	220.30 km^{2} (85.06 sq mi)	221.97 km^{2} (85.70 sq mi)
Population density	3.5/km^{2} (9.1/sq mi)	3.0/km^{2} (7.8/sq mi)	2.9/km^{2} (7.5/sq mi)
Median age	52.4 (M: 50.0, F: 53.2)	52.1 (M: 51.2, F: 54.0)
Private dwellings	519 (total) 328 (occupied)	515 (total)	433 (total)
Median household income	$64,500

References: 2021 2016 2011

Historical census populations – Plummer Additional

Year	Pop.	±%
1911	267	—
1921	435	+62.9%
1931	434	−0.2%
1941	381	−12.2%
1951	364	−4.5%
1956	431	+18.4%
1961	446	+3.5%

Year	Pop.	±%
1966	389	−12.8%
1971	533	+37.0%
1976	583	+9.4%
1981	562	−3.6%
1986	585	+4.1%
1991	596	+1.9%
1996	693	+16.3%

Year	Pop.	±%
2001	671	−3.2%
2006	625	−6.9%
2011	650	+4.0%
2016	660	+1.5%
2021	757	+14.7%

Population counts are not adjusted for boundary changes.
Source: Statistics Canada

== Transportation ==
The township is served by Highway 17 which traverses the south in an east–west orientation, and Highway 638, which travels the middle of the township in a north–south orientation.

== See also ==
- List of townships in Ontario
