= Laird, Ontario =

Laird
- Township (single-tier)
- Township of Laird
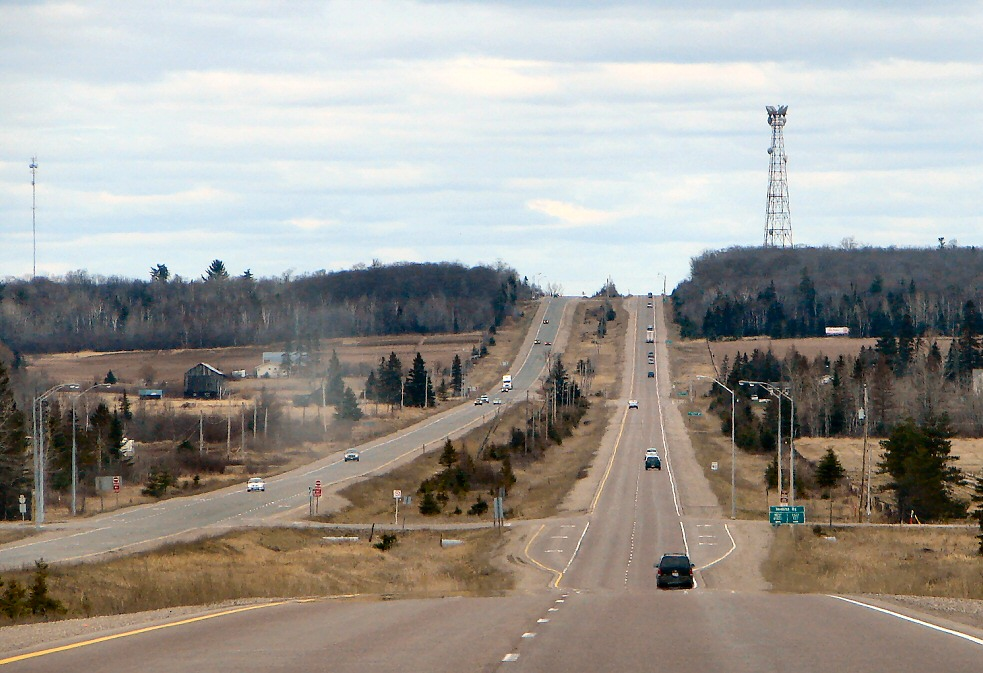
- Highway 17 through Laird Township

- Location within Ontario
- Coordinates: 46°23′N 84°04′W
- Country: Canada
- Province: Ontario
- District: Algoma
- Settled: 1874
- Incorporated: 1891

Government
  - Mayor: Shawn Evoy
  - MP: Terry Sheehan (Liberal)
  - MPP: Bill Rosenberg (PC)

Area
  - Land: 103.25 km^{2} (39.87 sq mi)

Population (2021)
  - Total: 1,121
  - Density: 10.9/km^{2} (28/sq mi)
- Time zone: UTC-5 (EST)
  - Summer (DST): UTC-4 (EDT)
- Postal Code: P0S
- Area codes: 705, 249
- Website: www.lairdtownship.ca

Laird is a township and village in the Algoma District in Northern Ontario, Canada. The township had a population of 1,121 in the 2021 Canadian census, up from 1,047 in the 2016 census.

The township is named after David Laird.

== Communities ==
The township includes the named communities of Laird (46°23′52″N 84°03′33″W) and Neebish (46°21′23″N 84°06′21″W). It also includes a portion of Bar River, a small hamlet straddling the boundary between the townships of Laird and Macdonald, Meredith and Aberdeen Additional.

== Demographics ==
In the 2021 Census of Population conducted by Statistics Canada, Laird had a population of 1,121 living in 470 of its 560 total private dwellings, a change of 7.1% from its 2016 population of 1,047. With a land area of 103.25 km^{2} (39.87 sq mi), it had a population density of 10.9/km^{2} (28.1/sq mi) in 2021.

Canada census – Laird community profile

| | 2021 | 2016 | 2011 |
| Population | 1,121 (+7.1% from 2016) | 1,047 (-0.9% from 2011) | 1,057 (-1.9% from 2006) |
| Land area | 103.25 km^{2} (39.87 sq mi) | 102.48 km^{2} (39.57 sq mi) | 102.43 km^{2} (39.55 sq mi) |
| Population density | 10.9/km^{2} (28/sq mi) | 10.2/km^{2} (26/sq mi) | 10.3/km^{2} (27/sq mi) |
| Median age | 50.4 (M: 49.2, F: 50.8) | 48.1 (M: 47.5, F: 48.7) |
| Private dwellings | 560 (total) 470 (occupied) | 527 (total) | 610 (total) |
| Median household income | $103,000 | $87,680 |

References: 2021 2016 2011

Historical census populations – Laird, Ontario

| Year | Pop. | ±% |
|---|---|---|
| 1901 | 436 | — |
| 1911 | 476 | +9.2% |
| 1921 | 531 | +11.6% |
| 1931 | 631 | +18.8% |
| 1941 | 475 | −24.7% |
| 1951 | 438 | −7.8% |
| 1956 | 424 | −3.2% |

| Year | Pop. | ±% |
|---|---|---|
| 1961 | 629 | +48.3% |
| 1966 | 600 | −4.6% |
| 1971 | 689 | +14.8% |
| 1976 | 744 | +8.0% |
| 1981 | 870 | +16.9% |
| 1986 | 864 | −0.7% |
| 1991 | 997 | +15.4% |

| Year | Pop. | ±% |
|---|---|---|
| 1996 | 1,073 | +7.6% |
| 2001 | 1,021 | −4.8% |
| 2006 | 1,078 | +5.6% |
| 2011 | 1,057 | −1.9% |
| 2016 | 1,047 | −0.9% |
| 2021 | 1,121 | +7.1% |

Source: Statistics Canada

== Transportation ==
Highway 17 passes through the township. Tarbutt is a neighbour of Laird and is separated by a low-grade dirt road called "Townline Road" which spurs into a road to Pine Island.

== See also ==
- List of townships in Ontario
