= Bruce Mines =

- Town (single-tier)
- Town of Bruce Mines
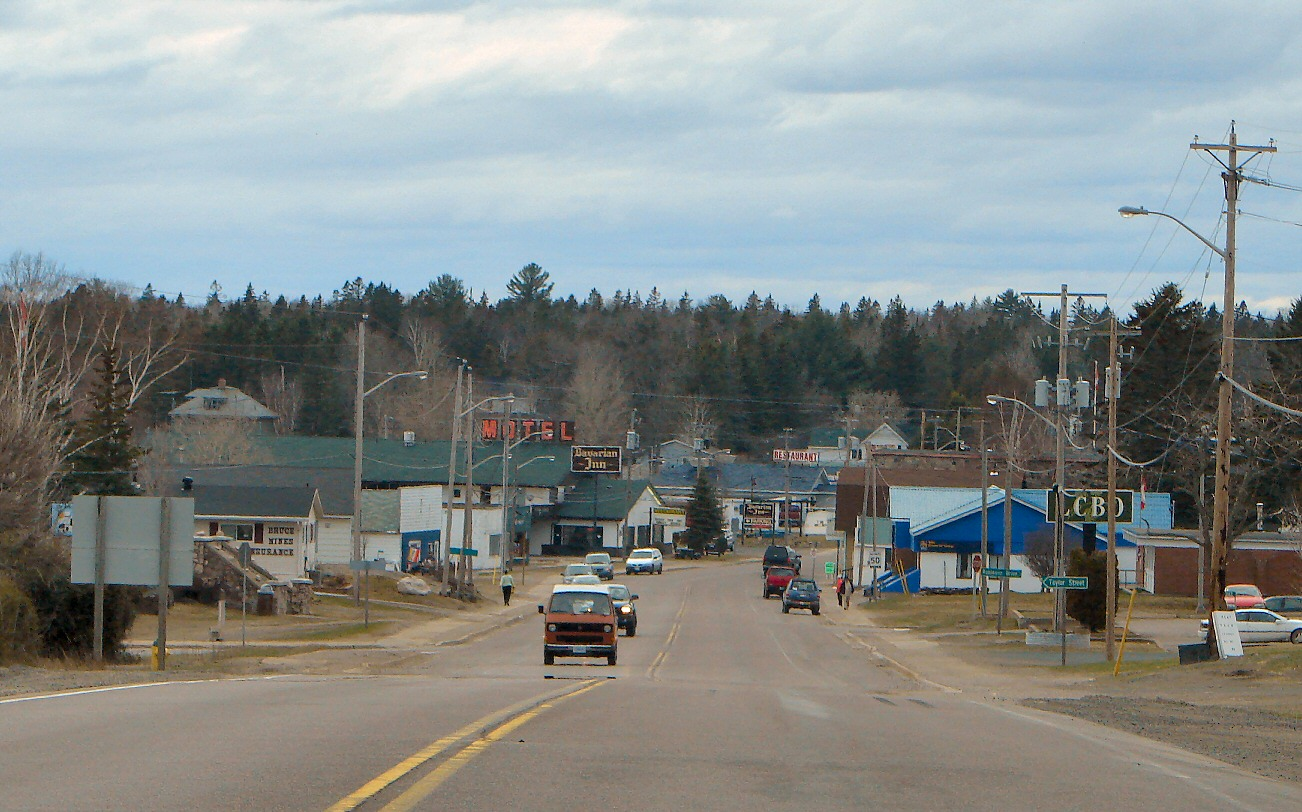
- Highway 17 through Bruce Mines.
- Nickname: Bruce
- Location within Ontario
- Coordinates: 46°17′N 83°47′W
- Country: Canada
- Province: Ontario
- District: Algoma
- Settled: 1846
- Incorporated: 1903

Government
  - Mayor: Lory Patteri
  - MP: Terry Sheehan (Liberal)
  - MPP: Bill Rosenberg (PC)

Area
  - Land: 6.09 km^{2} (2.35 sq mi)

Population (2021)
  - Total: 582
  - Density: 95.6/km^{2} (248/sq mi)
- Time zone: UTC-5 (Eastern (EST))
  - Summer (DST): UTC-4 (EDT)
- Postal Code: P0R 1C0
- Area codes: 705 and 249
- Website: www.brucemines.ca

Bruce Mines is a town in the Canadian province of Ontario, located on the north shore of Lake Huron in the Algoma District along Highway 17. The town of Bruce Mines had a population of 582 residents in 2021. The current mayor of Bruce Mines is Lory Patteri.

The Township of Plummer Additional depends on Bruce Mines and other urban centres for most of its commercial and community services. In the 2010 municipal election, winning mayoral candidate Gordon Post pledged to investigate the feasibility of reamalgamating Bruce Mines and Plummer Additional.

== History ==
Cornish emigrants began to arrive in the area in 1842.

Copper deposits at Bruce Mines came to the attention of non-native settlers in 1846, and mining began that year. The area was named after James Bruce, the Earl of Elgin, appointed Governor General of Canada in 1846. The Bruce Mines comprised Bruce, Wellington and Copper Bay mines. In 1876 the mines were closed due to floods, cave-ins, and declining profits, leading to a shift to agricultural development in the area. Mining resumed from 1915 to 1921, and despite occasional efforts to resume mining, has been inactive since then. However, the mine shafts are still open for the public to see. Bruce Mines was the second ever copper mining town in all of North America behind Cliff Mine in Michigan's Copper Country. An Ontario Historical Plaque was erected by the province to commemorate the Bruce Mines' role in Ontario's heritage.

=== Early history ===
The Bruce Mines changed ownership several times between 1847 and 1944 when they were decommissioned. Flooding and cave-ins in 1876 ended the 30-year period of active mining history. In the 1870s, agriculture and logging prospered in the wake of uncertainty with the mines. The Township of Plummer Additional was incorporated in 1891; the Town of Bruce Mines became Northern Ontario's first town when it separated from the township and incorporated in 1903. Several attempts by Mond Nickel to re-open the mines, shipping the quartz–copper flux ore to Sudbury, in the early 1900s saw only limited success. Mond Nickel shut down the Bruce Mines in 1921. The mines were decommissioned in 1944 and forestry activities have declined, but agriculture, aggregate extraction and tourism continue as the main economic activities in the area.

=== Marina history ===
In 1846, the first copper mine opened in Bruce Mines. Miners from Cornwall, England, immigrated to the area to work the mines. The mining companies quickly built wharves and docks in the bay to handle the influx of people and materials. Two of the mine managers built their homes at the entrance to the main dock property. They made sure that only approved boats used the docks. The mining companies did not allow any stores to open in their town. All of the miners and their families were forced to purchase from the Company Store. The Marks brothers from Hilton Beach would load a barge on St. Joseph Island and bring fresh produce, meat and lumber to the miners in Bruce Mines. They were not allowed to land on the dock, so would anchor their barge in the middle of the bay and the people of Bruce Mines would row and paddle out to buy merchandise from them. Eventually, they opened one of the first mercantile stores in Bruce Mines. A Company tugboat, the "E. P. Sawyer", was a familiar sight in Bruce Mines. This tug was used to move barges around the bay from the different mines located in Bruce Mines. Passenger vessels, such as the "Caribou" and the "Premier" also stopped on a regular basis in Bruce Mines. These vessels brought much-needed cargo and passengers to the area. The "Premier" burned and sank at the dock in 1923. Divers later recovered the propeller and salvaged the metal from her boilers.

=== Museum history ===
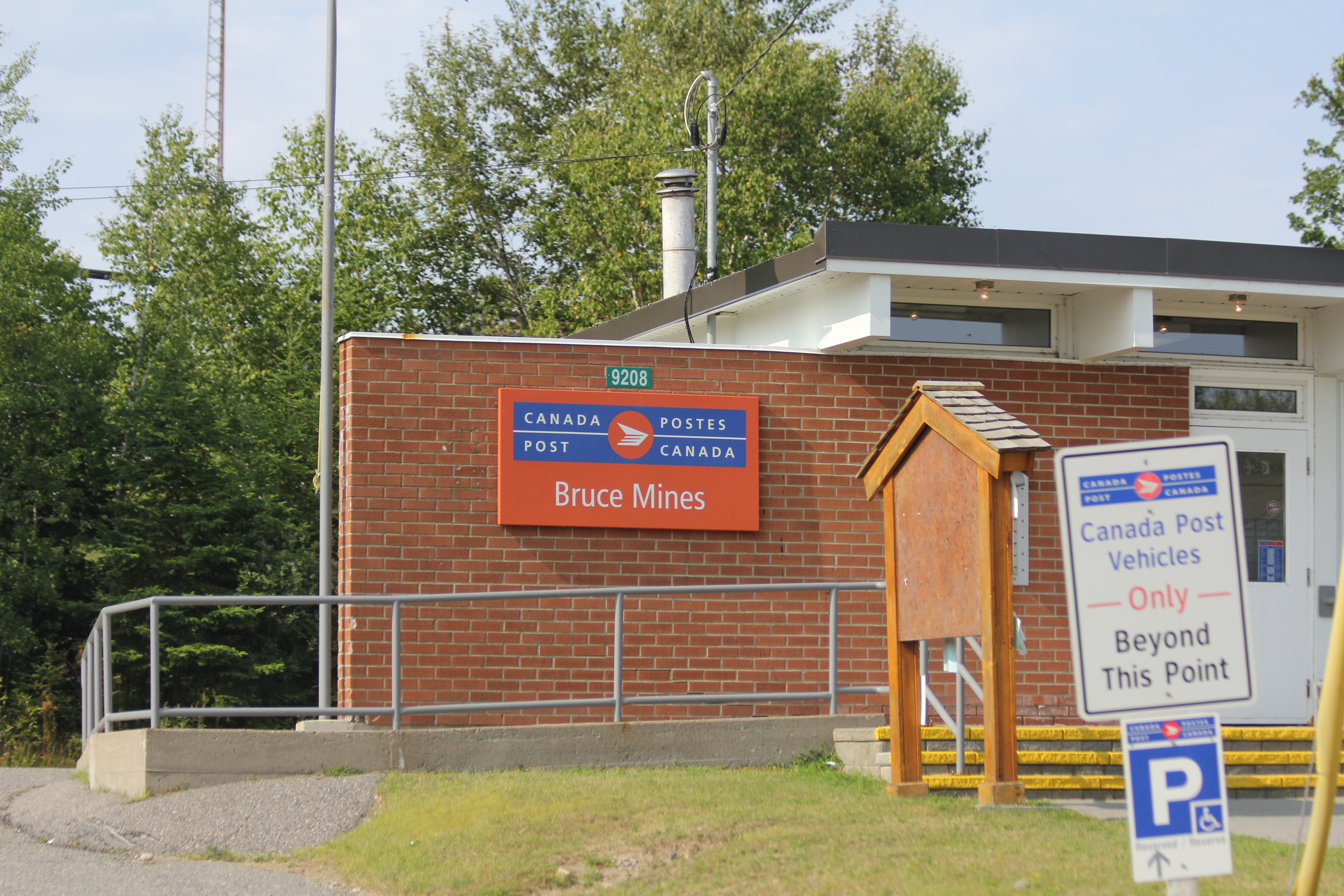
The post office for Bruce Mines

Built in 1894 as a Presbyterian Church, the "Church on the Rock" was used for services until 1917 when the congregation outgrew the church and united with the Methodist congregation, whose church could accommodate both groups. In the same year, a fire swept through the town and the local postmaster, whose building had been destroyed, moved the post office into the vacant church building. The building was used as a scout and church hall for many years until 1945 when another fire destroyed the Bruce Mines Public School. The building housed grades 9–12 for two years until grades 11 and 12 were moved to the old jail building and finally, in December 1948 the school moved into a new building. The building stood empty until the Town of Bruce Mines purchased it in 1950 when it was used as a public library and as a storage house for local artifacts. The museum officially opened in 1961 and in 1973 the library moved to the Bruce Mines Central School.

=== Library history ===
It arrived from England and was aimed at the miners and other workers (bush workers, agriculture people) and was called 'The Mechanics Institute Library and was the first library for Bruce Mines, way back in the 1860s. It was housed in the museum in the 1950s and early 60s at which time Plummer Additional and the Town of Bruce Mines collaborated and passed a bylaw forming the Union Public Library. The library moved to what is now the Arthur Henderson Public School. Johnson Township joined forces in the mid-80s by becoming a contracting library. On April 3, 1993, the library became a unit all on its own with a modern building and since then has become a hub of modern activity. The Library moved from a card-based catalogue and borrowing system to a state of the art electronic system called automation. HRDC made automation possible with a funding grant. 1996 brought the establishment of the first CAP (Community Access Program) site to provide internet access to the area. The library's website was developed in 1998 under its Art Committee.

=== McKay Island Lighthouse history ===
The McKay Island Lighthouse was built in 1907 to serve the timber industry. It had five keepers; Angus McNeish, Merrit Strum, Joseph Harvey, Gord Inch, and Mr. Wing. It became an unwatched light in October 1955. On October 25, 2009, the range light was converted to solar power with LED bulbs. It is now a housekeeping lighthouse and available to rent as accommodation.

== Demographics ==
In the 2021 Census of Population conducted by Statistics Canada, Bruce Mines had a population of 582 living in 263 of its 293 total private dwellings, a change of 0% from its 2016 population of 582. With a land area of 6.09 km^{2} (2.35 sq mi), it had a population density of 95.6/km^{2} (247.5/sq mi) in 2021.

Canada census – Bruce Mines community profile

	2021	2016	2011
Population	582 (0.0% from 2016)	582 (+2.8% from 2011)	566 (−3.1% from 2006)
Land area	6.09 km^{2} (2.35 sq mi)	6.22 km^{2} (2.40 sq mi)	6.13 km^{2} (2.37 sq mi)
Population density	95.6/km^{2} (248/sq mi)	93.6/km^{2} (242/sq mi)	92.3/km^{2} (239/sq mi)
Median age	58.4 (M: 59.2, F: 57.2)	55.9 (M: 56.6, F: 55.0)	53.2 (M: 53.3, F: 53.1)
Private dwellings	293 (total) 263 (occupied)	299 (total)	285 (total)
Median household income	$65,000	$51,200

References: 2021 2016 2011

Historical census populations – Bruce Mines

Year	Pop.	±%
1871	1,298	—
1881	472	−63.6%
1891	750	+58.9%
1901	894	+19.2%
1911	689	−22.9%
1921	477	−30.8%
1931	473	−0.8%
1941	362	−23.5%

Year	Pop.	±%
1951	370	+2.2%
1956	451	+21.9%
1961	484	+7.3%
1966	502	+3.7%
1971	505	+0.6%
1976	517	+2.4%
1981	635	+22.8%
1986	626	−1.4%

Year	Pop.	±%
1991	684	+9.3%
1996	653	−4.5%
2001	627	−4.0%
2006	584	−6.9%
2011	566	−3.1%
2016	582	+2.8%
2021	582	+0.0%

Source: Statistics Canada

== Attractions ==
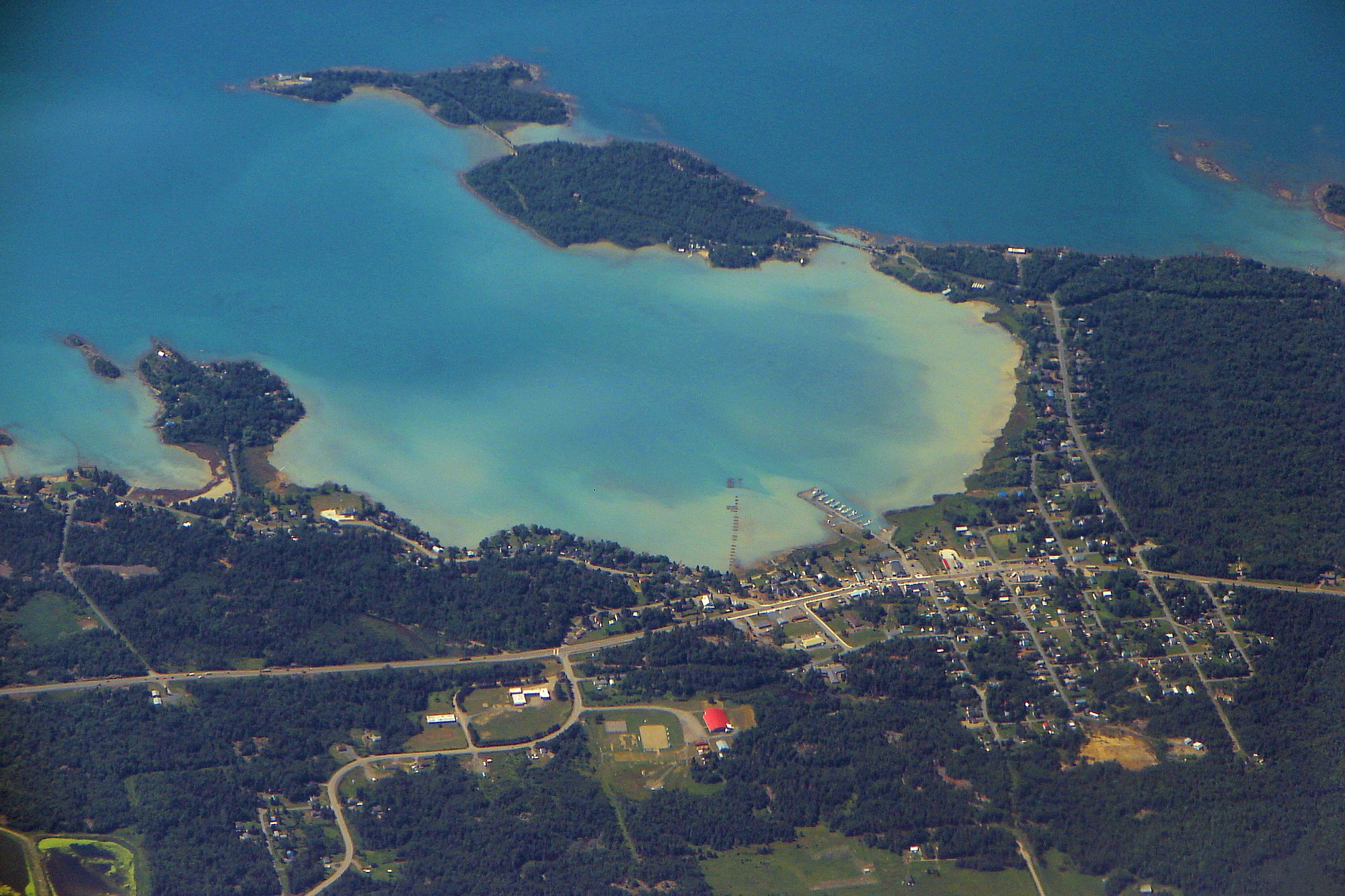
Aerial view of Bruce Mines

=== Library ===
Open all year round is the Bruce Mines and Plummer Additional Union Public Library. Located at 33 Desbarats street, off of Robinson drive from Highway 17.

=== Fall Fair ===
Bruce Mines is known for the annual Fall Fair events hosted at the Bruce Mines Exhibition Grounds & Arena. The Fall Fair has been held on the second weekend in September since 1880. Some of the attractions include:

- Demolition Derby
- Tractor Pull
- ATV Pull
- Horse Pull
- Pet Show
- Alpaca 4-H Club Demonstrations and Obstacle Courses
- Student Art Displays
- Dancing
- Bar
- Food Booths
- Tricycle and Battery Car Races

=== Museum ===
The museum and archives, also known as the "church on the rock", was a Presbyterian Church built in 1894, and later used as a post office and a school. The museum began in 1960 and houses over 7000 artifacts of Bruce Mines and Area history and archives that include:

- Genealogical, census, birth, death, marriage, and baptismal records
- Copies and originals of photos of pioneer families and the town mining documents
- The 1850 Bruce Mines Postmaster Joshua Coatsworth journals containing letters, sketches, and poetry
- A customs ledger from the company wharf with entries dated 1850 to 1872

=== Marina ===
The Bruce Mines Marina and Waterfront is located in the center of Bruce Mines.

== Sports teams ==
=== Hockey ===
Minor hockey has been a major part of Bruce Mines sports, with teams that date back to the early 1930s. The two most famous Bruce Mines hockey teams are the Bruce Mines Copper Kings and the Copper Bay Flames. Together, they garnered more trophies than any other local teams, which are on display at the Bruce Mines Arena. In 2001, local hockey basically stopped dead in its tracks due to lack of interest to play in Bruce Mines. There hasn't been a team since then. However, there are still games being played there such as the annual "Grudge Match", "Women's Tournament", and "Men's 3-on-3 Tournament".

=== Soccer ===
Bruce Mines partners with Desbarats to participate in soccer, in a local league with St. Joseph Island, and Echo Bay.

== Transportation ==
Ontario Northland provides intercity motor coach service to Bruce Mines as a flag stop along its Sault Ste. Marie–Sudbury–North Bay–Ottawa route, with one bus a day each headed eastbound and westbound from Sunday to Friday, with no service on Saturdays.

== Notable people ==
- James MacNaughton, businessman
- Wilfred Lynn Miller, politician

== See also ==
- List of towns in Ontario
