= Tarbutt =

- Township (single-tier)
- Township of Tarbutt
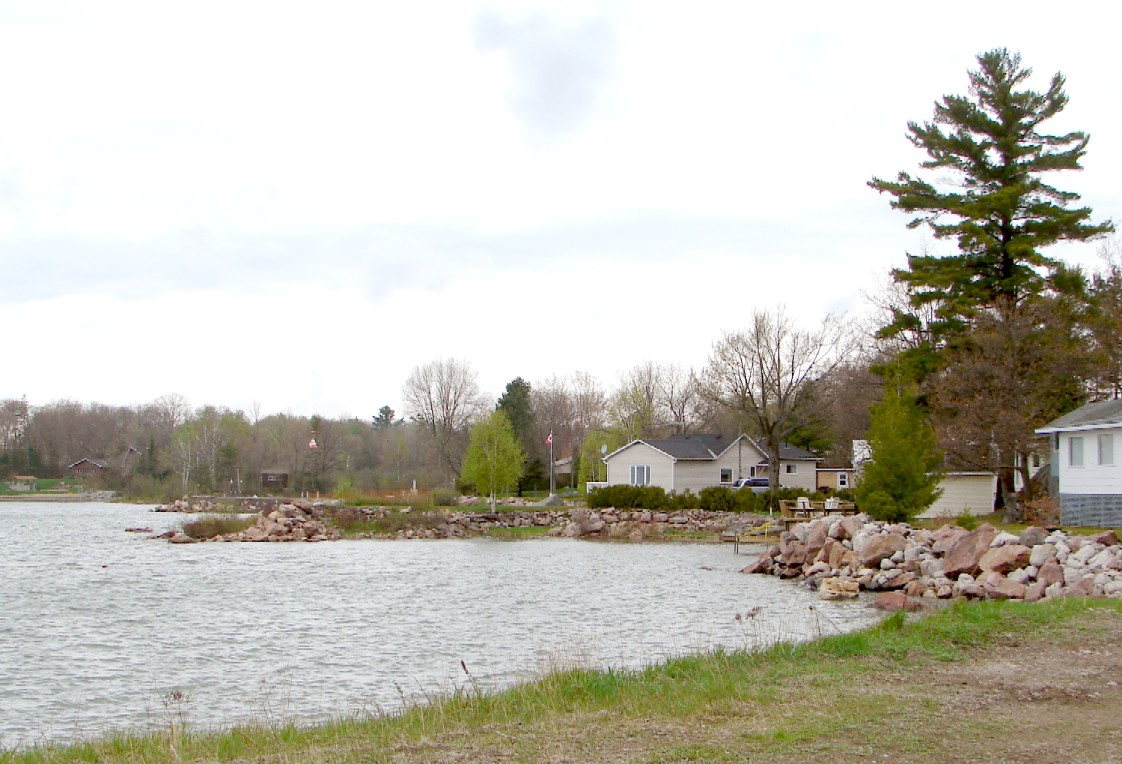
- Port Findlay

- Location within Ontario
- Coordinates: 46°21′N 84°00′W
- Country: Canada
- Province: Ontario
- District: Algoma
- Settled: 1870s
- Incorporated: December 22, 1911

Government
  - Mayor: Lennox Smith
  - Fed. riding: Sault Ste. Marie—Algoma
  - Prov. riding: Algoma—Manitoulin

Area
  - Land: 52.79 km^{2} (20.38 sq mi)

Population (2021)
  - Total: 573
  - Density: 10.9/km^{2} (28/sq mi)
- Time zone: UTC-5 (EST)
  - Summer (DST): UTC-4 (EDT)
- Postal Code: P0R
- Area codes: 705, 249
- Website: www.tarbutt.ca

Tarbutt (formerly known as Tarbutt and Tarbutt Additional) is a township in the Canadian province of Ontario, located within the Algoma District. The township is about 40 kilometres (25 mi) east of Sault Ste. Marie.

Its population centres are Port Findlay (46°19′05″N 84°01′09″W) and MacLennan (46°21′05″N 84°01′22″W). It is the only municipality along the North Channel of Lake Huron which includes no residential communities located directly along Highway 17; MacLennan is located north of the highway at the intersection of MacLennan Road and Government Road, while Port Findlay is located at the south end of MacLennan Road along the waterfront.

In December 2016, the municipal council adopted a by-law to officially shorten the name of the township from The Corporation of the Township of Tarbutt & Tarbutt Additional to the Corporation of the Township of Tarbutt, effective in January 2017.

== Demographics ==
In the 2021 Census of Population conducted by Statistics Canada, Tarbutt and Tarbutt Additional had a population of 573 living in 239 of its 398 total private dwellings, a change of 7.3% from its 2016 population of 534. With a land area of 52.79 km^{2} (20.38 sq mi), it had a population density of 10.9/km^{2} (28.1/sq mi) in 2021.

Canada census – Tarbutt community profile

	2021	2016	2011
Population	573 (+7.3% from 2016)	534 (+34.8% from 2011)	396 (+2.1% from 2006)
Land area	52.79 km^{2} (20.38 sq mi)	52.82 km^{2} (20.39 sq mi)	53.14 km^{2} (20.52 sq mi)
Population density	10.9/km^{2} (28/sq mi)	10.1/km^{2} (26/sq mi)	7.5/km^{2} (19/sq mi)
Median age	49.6 (M: 51.2, F: 48.8)	47.6 (M: 49.6, F: 46.1)
Private dwellings	398 (total) 239 (occupied)	400 (total) 216 (occupied)	309 (total)
Median household income	$104,000	$88,320

References: 2021 2016 2011

Historical census populations - Tarbutt

Year	Pop.	±%
1881	352	—
1891	795	+125.9%
1901	368	−53.7%
1911	357	−3.0%
1921	328	−8.1%
1931	338	+3.0%
1941	261	−22.8%
1951	200	−23.4%

Year	Pop.	±%
1956	213	+6.5%
1961	241	+13.1%
1966	212	−12.0%
1971	254	+19.8%
1976	323	+27.2%
1981	307	−5.0%
1986	341	+11.1%
1991	439	+28.7%

Year	Pop.	±%
1996	442	+0.7%
2001	466	+5.4%
2006	388	−16.7%
2011	396	+2.1%
2016	534	+34.8%
2021	573	+7.3%

Source: Statistics Canada

== See also ==
- List of townships in Ontario
