= Peter McArthur =

Peter McArthur may refer to:

- Peter McArthur (writer) (1866–1924), Canadian writer and farmer
- Peter McArthur (politician) (1937–2017), member of the Victorian Legislative Assembly
- Pete MacArthur (born 1985), American ice hockey player
