= Waterloo Regional Police Service =

Waterloo Regional Police Service Service de police régional de Waterloo
- The WPRS logo

Agency overview
- Formed: 1973
- Annual budget: $140,000,000 (2014)

Jurisdictional structure
- Operations jurisdiction: Waterloo Region, Ontario, Canada
- Area: 1,382 km² or 533.59 sq mi
- Population: 560,000 (2014)

Operational structure
- Headquarters: 200 Maple Grove Rd, Cambridge, Ontario 43.41852356891037°N 80.38777505958961°W
- Sworn members: 800
- Elected officer responsible: The Honourable Michael Kerzner, Solicitor General of Ontario
- Agency executive: Bryan Larkin, chief of police
- Divisions: 5

Facilities
- Stations: Headquarters; 3 stations; 2 sub-stations

Website
- Waterloo Regional Police Service

The Waterloo Regional Police Service (WRPS; French: Service de police régional de Waterloo) provides policing services for the Regional Municipality of Waterloo in Ontario, Canada, which encompasses the cities of Waterloo, Kitchener, and Cambridge, as well as the townships of North Dumfries, Wellesley, Wilmot and Woolwich. The WRPS was established in 1973, to replace the individual police departments in the region. The cities of Kitchener, Waterloo and Galt; the towns of Preston, Hespeler, Elmira and New Hamburg; the Village of Bridgeport and Waterloo Township had their own respective police department. The townships of Woolwich, Wellesley, Wilmot and North Dumfries were under the jurisdiction of the Ontario Provincial Police. In 1991 the Waterloo Regional Police Force was renamed to their current name.

== Organization ==
On July 15, 2014, Bryan Larkin was named chief of police. He replaced Matt Torigian, who had been chief of police since December, 2007. In 1991, to minimize the negativity associated with the word force, the department changed its name from "Waterloo Regional Police Force" to "Waterloo Regional Police Service".

=== Headquarters ===
The WRPS' headquarters is located at 200 Maple Grove Road on the border with Cambridge and Kitchener. This site was chosen as it is geographically centre to all the urban areas within the region. Waterloo Regional Police Headquarters has a museum in the lobby complete with old uniforms, equipment and information on the departments prior to 1973.

== Operational patrol divisions ==
North - formerly Division 3 - 45 Columbia St. E., Waterloo

Central - formerly Division 1 - 134 Frederick St, Kitchener

South - formerly Division 2 - 176 Hespeler Rd, Cambridge

Rural North - formerly Division 3A- 13 Industrial Dr, Elmira

Rural South - formerly Division 1A- 34 Peel St, New Hamburg

== Branches and divisions ==
The Waterloo Regional Police Service is made up of:

Patrol divisions

- North Division - serving the City of Waterloo, and areas of Kitchener not served by Central Division
- Central Division - serving the City of Kitchener (East of Victoria Street, south of Belmont Ave to Highland and south of Westmount to Highway 7/8)
- South Division - serving the City of Cambridge, and areas of Kitchener (Doon South, Trillium Industrial Park, Parkway, Hidden Valley)
- Rural North - serving Woolwich and Wellesley townships
- Rural South - serving Wilmot and North Dumfries townships

All divisions have a criminal investigations branch.

Investigative services

- Homicide
- Major case unit
- Fraud branch
- Traffic services
- Forensic identification
- Domestic violence unit
- Elder abuse
- Traffic
- Collision reporting centre
- Technical crime unit

Strategic and tactical services (Division 7)

- Special response unit
- Drug branch
- Intelligence

Support services

- Communications branch
- Records branch
- Evidence management
- Court services
- Information technology

Community and corporate services

- Community resources
- Human resources
- Training branch
- Quality assurance

Policing standards

- Public complaints

Executive office

- Media relations
- Emergency planning
- Research and planning
- Business planning

== Shoulder flashes ==
Shoulder flashes are worn on the uniforms of Waterloo Regional Police officers.

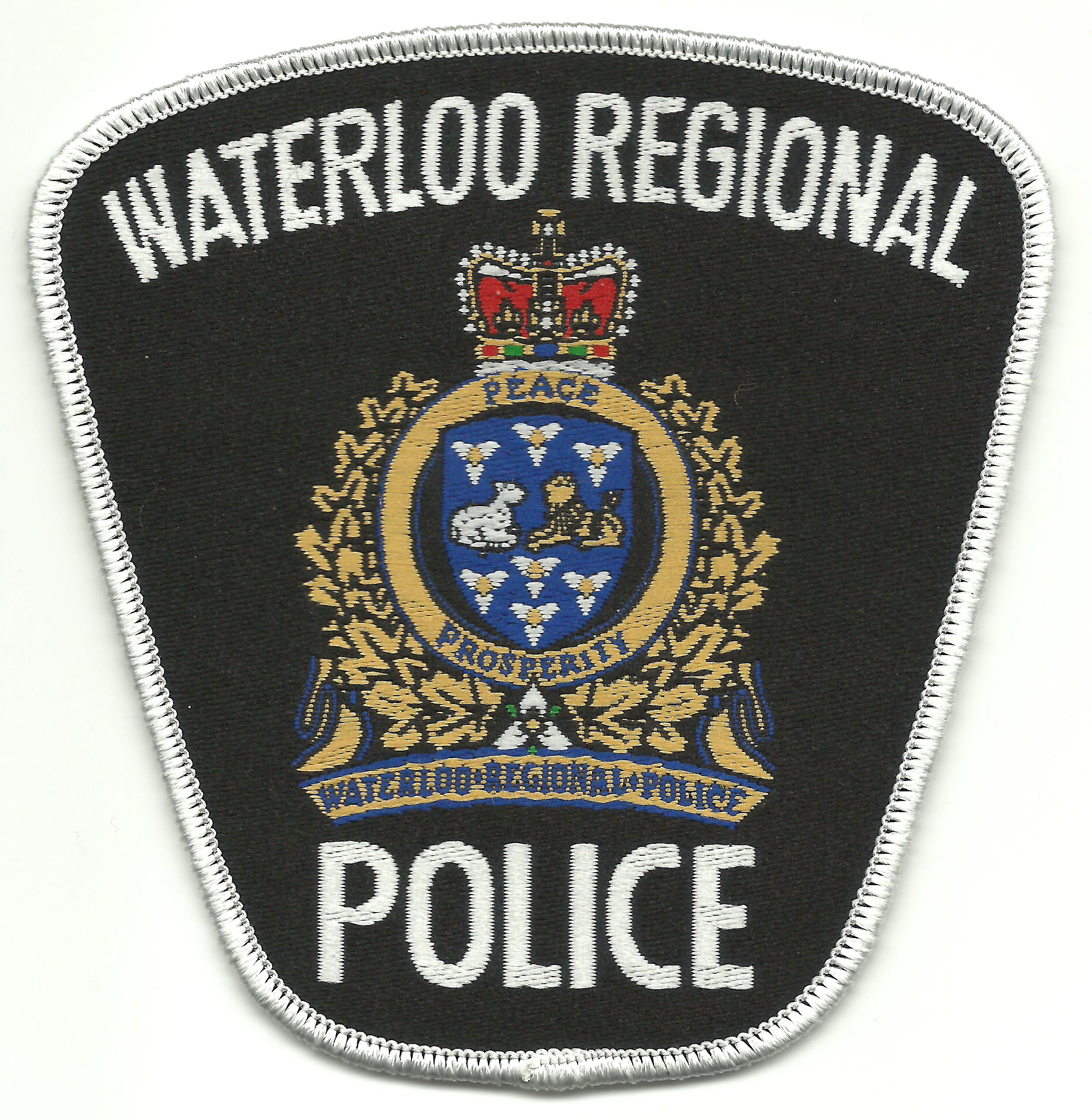
Standard officer flash

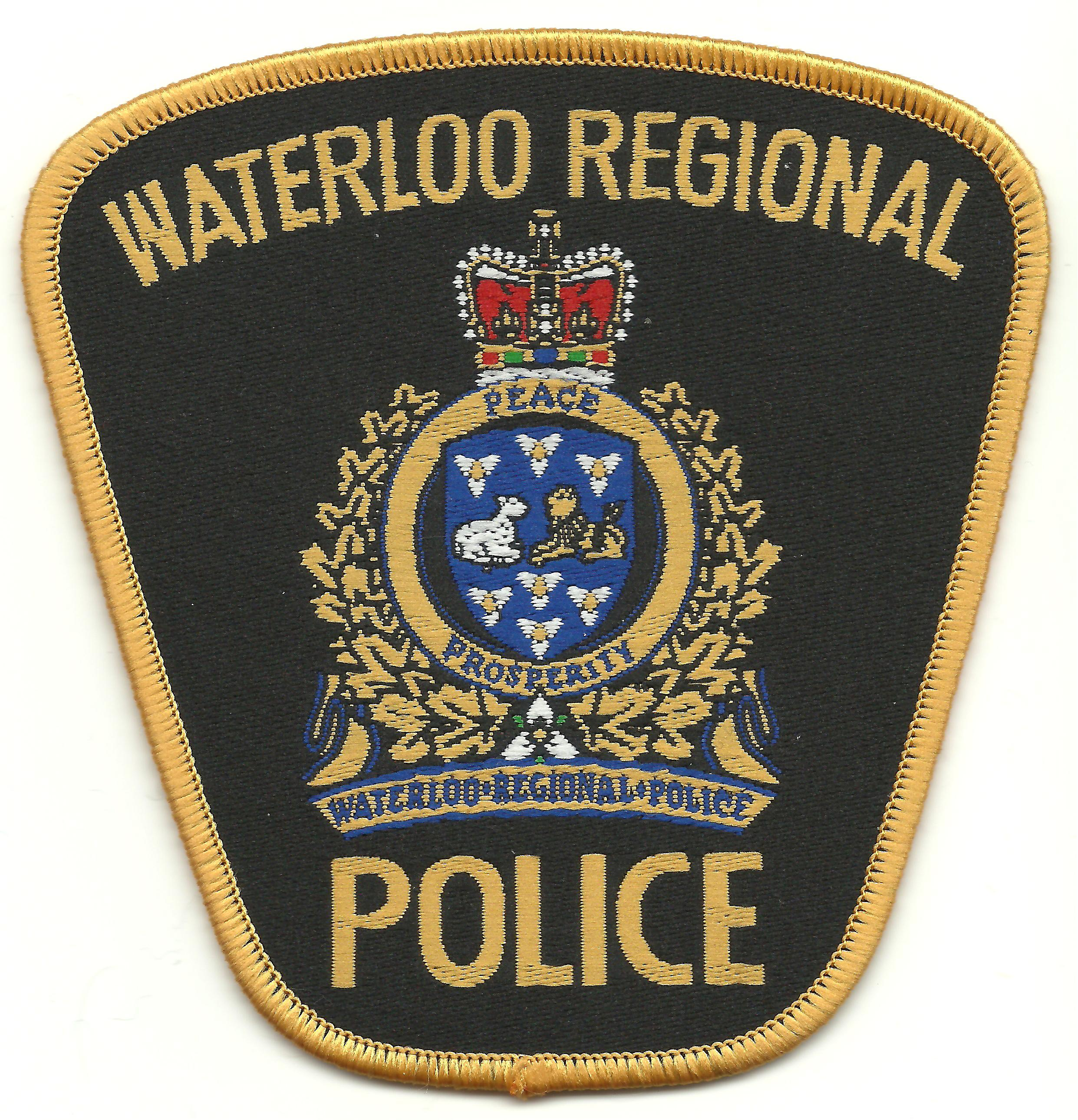
Senior officer flash

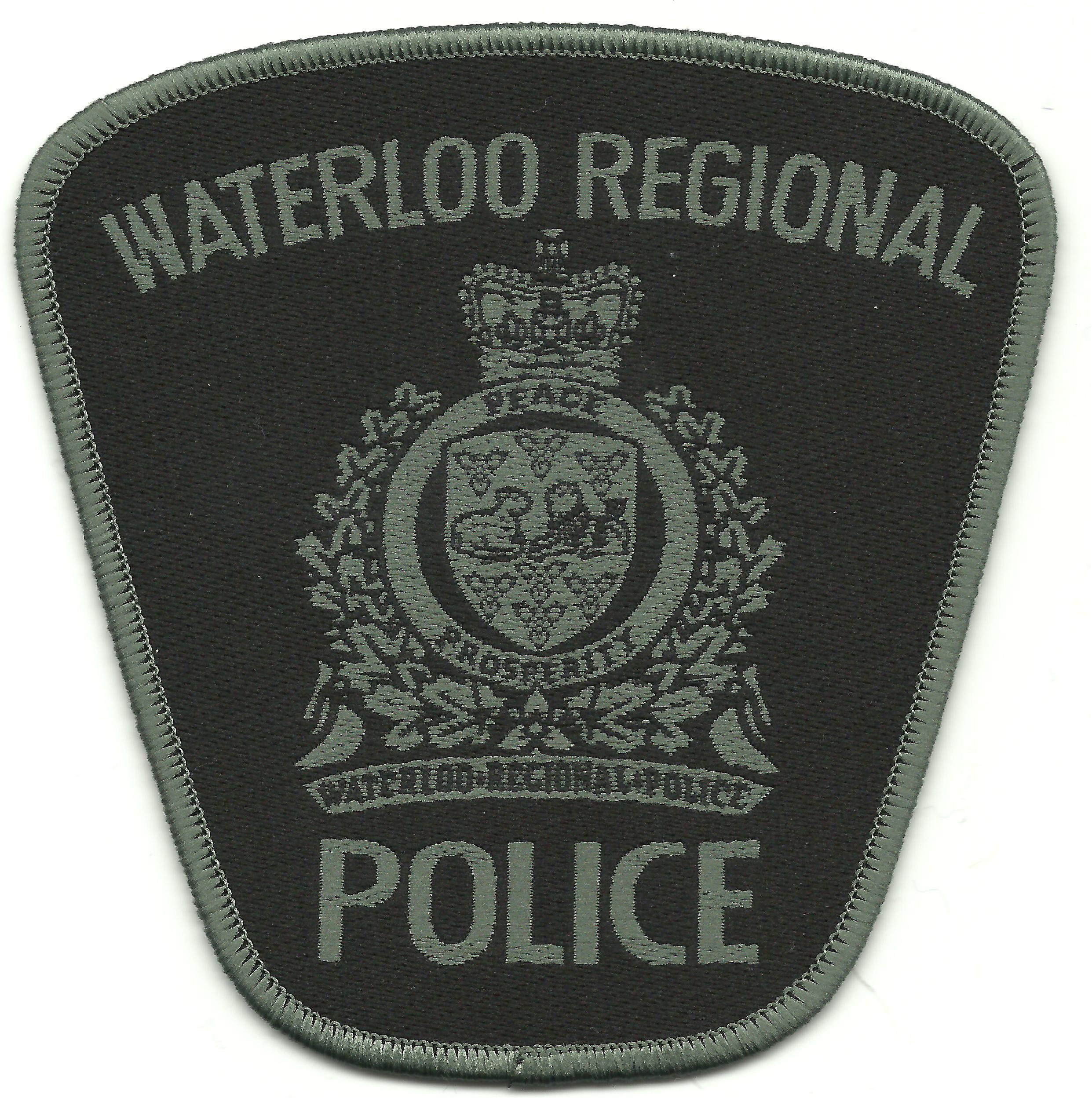
Emergency response team black

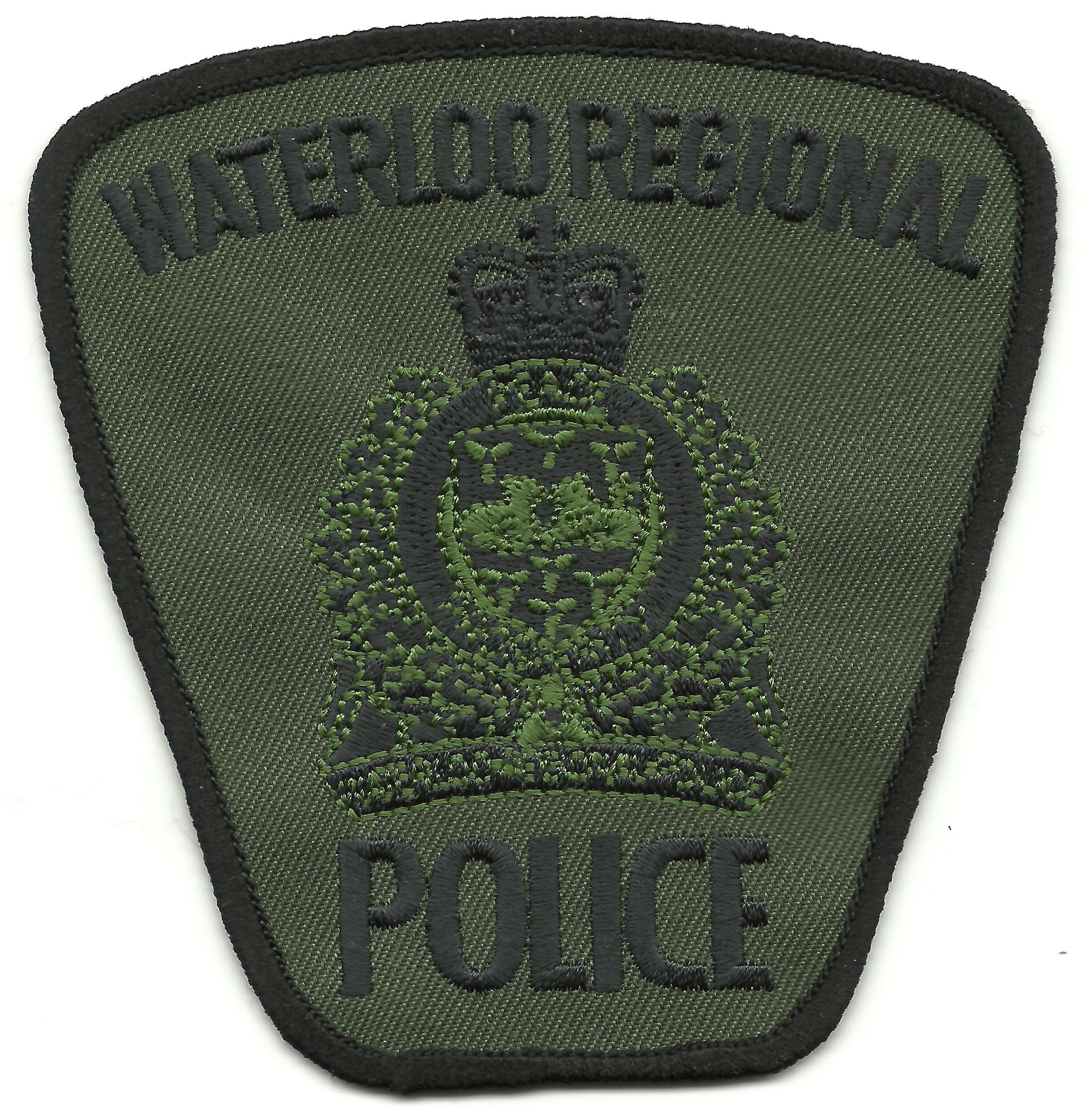
Emergency response team green

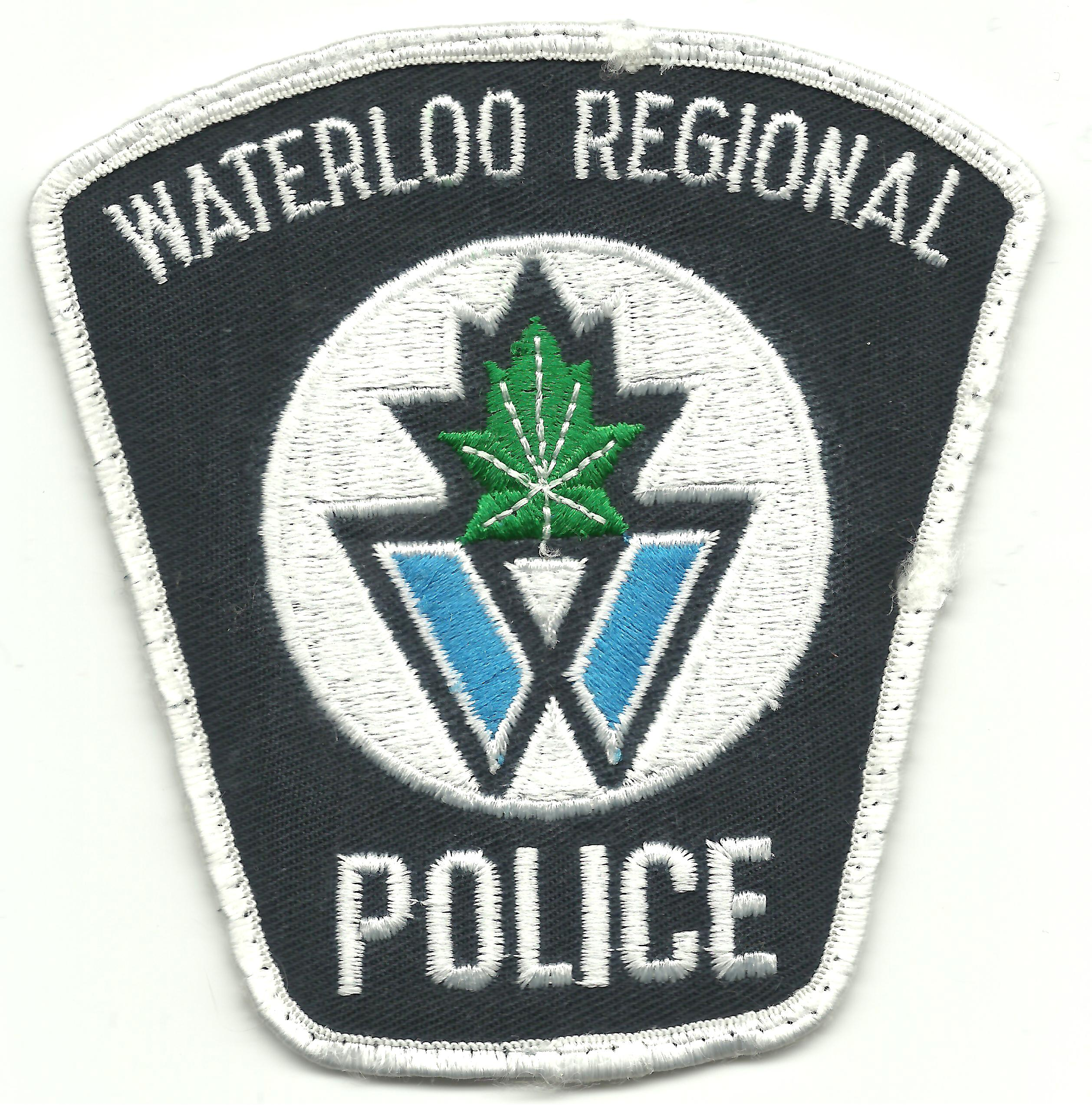
Old shoulder flash

== Fleet ==
=== Current vehicles in service ===
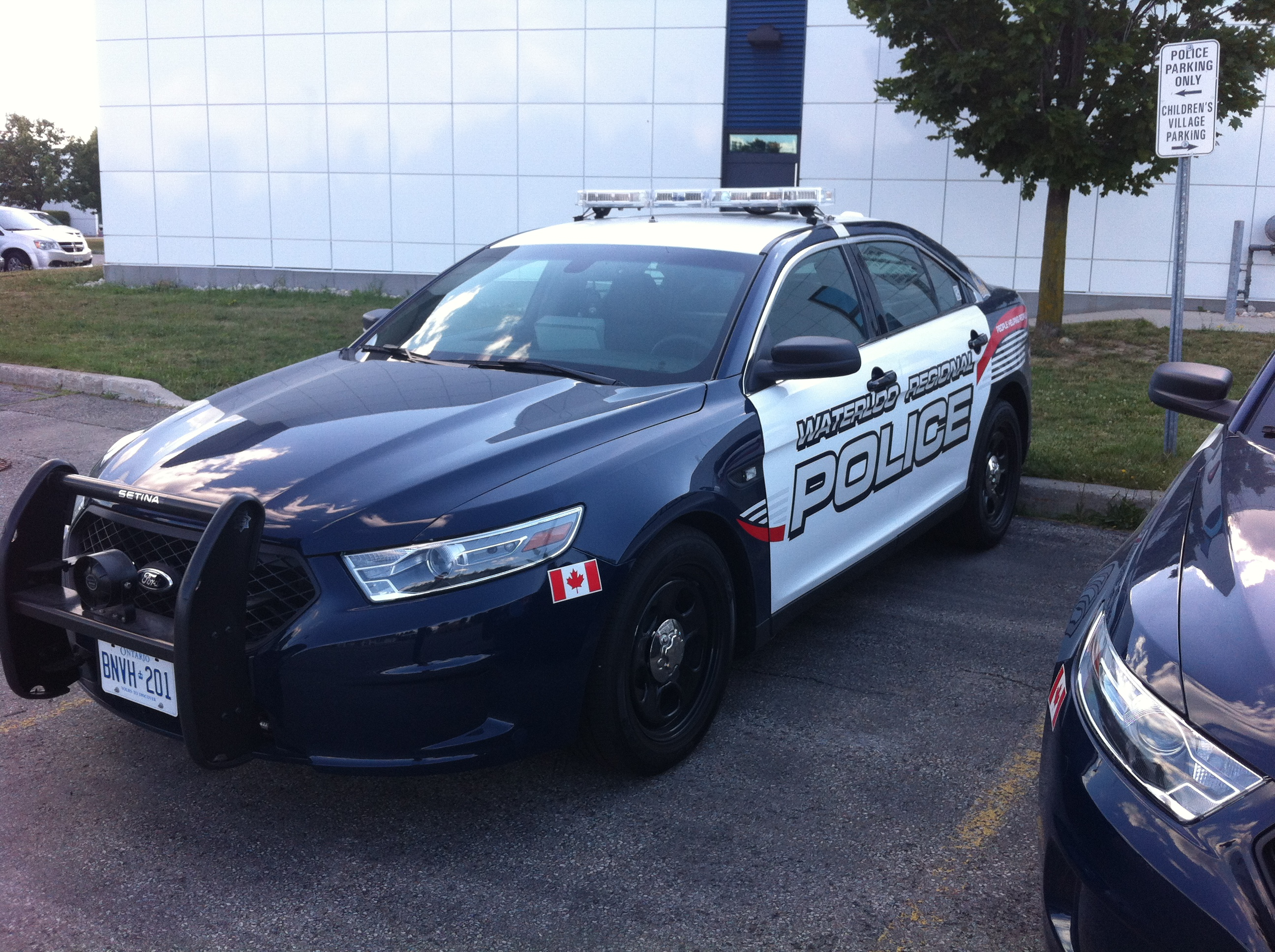
Ford Police Interceptor Sedan equipped with snowplow

- Ford Police Interceptor Sedan
- Ford Police Interceptor Utility
- Dodge Magnum
- Ford E-Series
- GMC Savana
- Mercedes-Benz Sprinter

=== Vehicle markings ===
Marked cruisers are white, with hood, trunk lid, front and rear quarter panels and bumpers painted navy blue. The text Waterloo Regional Police in silver retroreflective text with a navy blue outline appears on the sides of the vehicles. A distinct solid red line curves from the front, through to the rear of the vehicle, with the motto "People Helping People" and "911" on the rear quarter panel. A series of white horizontal stripes appear above and below the curved red stripe. The crest of the police service appears on the rear pillar as well. A Canadian flag in addition to any special designations for the vehicle, such as "supervisor", "traffic", "duty officer" are displayed on the front fender. On the rear of the cruiser, the text "Waterloo Regional Police" is displayed on the left side of the trunk lid, and the vehicle number and divisional designation (where applicable) on the right side. On the bumper appears the police service website (wrps.on.ca), along with the Crime Stoppers tip-line number encompassed by retroreflective chevrons. Affixed to the roof is a red and blue LED light bar, as well as several antennas for communication and GPS.

== Officer ranks ==
The rank structure used by the WRPS is defined by regulations of Ontario's Police Services Act.

- Chief of police (crown and three maple leaves)
- Deputy chief (crown and two maple leaves)
- Superintendent (crown)
- Inspector (two maple leaves)
- Staff sergeant (crown and three chevrons)
- Sergeant (three chevrons)
- Constable

The Waterloo Regional Police Service does not use the rank of staff superintendent or staff inspector.

== Auxiliary unit ==
The Waterloo Regional Police Service also has an auxiliary unit, composed of approximately 75 unpaid civilian volunteers. Auxiliary officers assist with special events, parades, as well as community programs.

== See also ==
- Integrated Security Unit
- Ceremonial Band of the Waterloo Regional Police
