= Manitoulin (provincial electoral district) =

Former provincial electoral district in Ontario, Canada

Ontario electoral district

Defunct provincial electoral district
- Legislature: Legislative Assembly of Ontario
- District created: 1902
- District abolished: 1934
- First contested: 1902
- Last contested: 1929

Manitoulin was a provincial electoral district in Ontario, Canada. It was created in 1902 from part of the former electoral district of Algoma East, and was merged with Algoma to form Algoma-Manitoulin for the 1934 election.

== MPPs elected ==
Manitoulin
Assembly	Years	Member	Party
10th	1902–1904	Robert Roswell Gamey	Conservative
11th	1905–1908	Robert Roswell Gamey	Conservative
12th	1908–1911	Robert Roswell Gamey	Conservative
13th	1911–1914	Robert Roswell Gamey	Conservative
14th	1914–1917	Robert Roswell Gamey	Conservative
14th	1918–1919	Beniah Bowman	United Farmers
15th	1919–1923	Beniah Bowman	United Farmers
16th	1923–1926	Beniah Bowman	United Farmers
17th	1926–1929	Thomas Farquhar	United Farmers
18th	1929–1934	Alvin Edwin Graham	Conservative

== Election results ==
1929 Ontario general election
Party	Candidate	Votes	%	±%
Conservative	Alvin Edwin Graham	2,291	50.03	+1.16
United Farmers	Thomas Farquhar	2,288	49.97	–1.16
Total valid votes		4,579	99.39	
Total rejected ballots		28	0.61	+0.04
Turnout		4,607	74.57	+9.32
Eligible voters		6,178		
Conservative gain from United Farmers		Swing		+1.16
Source: Elections Ontario

1926 Ontario general election
Party	Candidate	Votes	%	±%
United Farmers	Thomas Farquhar	2,242	51.13	–6.51
Conservative	LeBaron Dibblee	2,143	48.87	+6.51
Total valid votes		4,385	99.43	
Total rejected ballots		25	0.57	–0.38
Turnout		4,410	65.26	–1.43
Eligible voters		6,758		
United Farmers hold		Swing		–6.51
Source: Elections Ontario

1923 Ontario general election
Party	Candidate	Votes	%	±%
United Farmers	Beniah Bowman	2,407	57.64	–2.56
Conservative	Frederick Smith	1,769	42.36	+2.56
Total valid votes		4,176	99.05	
Total rejected ballots		40	0.95	–1.21
Turnout		4,216	66.69	–
Eligible voters		6,322		
United Farmers hold		Swing		–2.56
Source: Elections Ontario

Ontario provincial by-election, December 15, 1919 Ministerial By-election, appointment as Minister of Lands, Forests and Mines
Party	Candidate	Votes
United Farmers	Beniah Bowman	acclaimed
Source: Elections Ontario

1919 Ontario general election
Party	Candidate	Votes	%	±%
United Farmers	Beniah Bowman	2,428	60.20	+6.50
Conservative	James Wilson Kinney	1,605	39.80	–
Total valid votes		4,033	97.84	
Total rejected ballots		89	2.16	–
Turnout		4,122	69.06	–
Eligible voters		5,969		
United Farmers hold		Swing		–
Source: Elections Ontario

Ontario provincial by-election, October 24, 1918 Death of Robert Roswell Gamey
Party	Candidate	Votes	%	±%
United Farmers	Beniah Bowman	1,740	53.70	–
Conservative	B.H. Turner	1,500	46.30	–
Total valid votes		3,240	97.84	
Total rejected ballots		–	–	
Turnout		–	–	
Eligible voters		–		
United Farmers gain from Conservative		Swing		–
Source: Elections Ontario

1914 Ontario general election
Party	Candidate	Votes	%	±%
Conservative	Robert Roswell Gamey	1,163	55.38	–19.31
Temperance	William E. Wilson	937	44.62	–
Total valid votes		2,100	99.43	
Total rejected ballots		12	0.57	–0.02
Turnout		2,112	65.12	+26.28
Eligible voters		3,243		
Conservative hold		Swing		–9.65
Source: Elections Ontario

1911 Ontario general election
Party	Candidate	Votes	%	±%
Conservative	Robert Roswell Gamey	1,254	74.69	+7.96
Liberal	Robert Tilson	425	25.31	–7.96
Total valid votes		1,679	99.41	
Total rejected ballots		10	0.59	–0.44
Turnout		1,689	38.85	–19.64
Eligible voters		4,348		
Conservative hold		Swing		+7.96
Source: Elections Ontario

1908 Ontario general election
Party	Candidate	Votes	%	±%
Conservative	Robert Roswell Gamey	1,414	66.73	+10.30
Liberal	John Carruthers	705	33.27	–3.36
Total valid votes		2,119	98.97	
Total rejected ballots		22	1.03	+0.63
Turnout		2,141	58.48	+15.82
Eligible voters		3,661		
Conservative hold		Swing		+6.83
Source: Elections Ontario

1905 Ontario general election
Party	Candidate	Votes	%	±%
Conservative	Robert Roswell Gamey	1,277	56.43	+4.53
Liberal	W. J. Tucker	829	36.63	–0.78
Socialist	S. P. Jackson	157	6.94	–
Total valid votes		2,263	99.60	
Total rejected ballots		9	0.40	–0.91
Turnout		2,272	42.66	–1.65
Eligible voters		5,326		
Conservative hold		Swing		+2.65
Source: Elections Ontario

1902 Ontario general election
Party	Candidate	Votes	%
Conservative	Robert Roswell Gamey	1,214	51.90
Liberal	J. M. Fraser	875	37.41
Independent	Mr. McMillan	250	10.69
Total valid votes		2,339	98.69
Total rejected ballots		31	1.31
Turnout		2,370	44.31
Eligible voters		5,349	
Conservative pickup new district.			
Source: Elections Ontario

== See also ==
- List of Ontario provincial electoral districts
- Canadian provincial electoral districts
