= Beniah Bowman =

Canadian politician (1886–1941)

MPP for Manitoulin
- In office October 24, 1918 – October 18, 1926
- Preceded by: Robert Roswell Gamey
- Succeeded by: Thomas Farquhar

Member of Parliament for Algoma East
- In office September 14, 1926 – July 28, 1930
- Preceded by: George Brecken Nicholson
- Succeeded by: George Brecken Nicholson

Personal details
- Born: March 14, 1886 Wilmot Township, Ontario, Canada
- Died: April 13, 1941 (aged 55) Toronto, Ontario, Canada
- Resting place: Hagey Cemetery, Preston, Ontario
- Party: United Farmers of Ontario (1918-1930); Liberal Party of Canada (1930)
- Spouse: Minnie Barr
- Occupation: Farmer

Beniah Bowman (March 14, 1886 – April 13, 1941) was an Ontario farmer and political figure. He represented Manitoulin in the Legislative Assembly of Ontario from October 24, 1918 to October 18, 1926 and Algoma East in the House of Commons of Canada from 1926 to 1930 as a United Farmers member.

== Early life ==
He was born in Wilmot Township in Waterloo County, Ontario, and his parents were of United Empire Loyalist stock. He attended schools in Doon and Hespeler. In 1908, he went to Owen Sound for a year to serve as an assistant to a Mennonite minister, and then went to Hespeler to preach. In 1911, he moved to Manitoulin Island and became a farmer, while still preaching occasionally at the Mennonite church at Little Current. He was also involved in lumbering and fishing.

== Political career ==
He was elected in a 1918 by-election held after the death of Robert Roswell Gamey, becoming the first member of his party to sit in the provincial assembly. He was re-elected in the 1919 provincial election in which the UFO staged an upset victory to form a coalition government with Independent Labour MLAs. Bowman was Minister of Lands and Forests in the provincial cabinet from 1920 to 1923.

He broke with the majority of UFO MLAs in Ontario following the 1923 provincial election when what had become known as the Progressive Party chose non-farmer William Edgar Raney as its leader. Instead, he and two other UFO MLAs sat as their own rump caucus, apart from the Progressives.

Bowman left provincial politics in 1926 to enter federal politics and was elected as a UFO MP for Algoma East to the House of Commons of Canada. In the 1930 federal election, he ran unsuccessfully for re-election as a Liberal candidate in 1930.

== Later years ==
Bowman later became president of a lumber company in Blind River, Ontario. He died on Easter Sunday in 1941, and was buried in Preston.
