= Doon Heritage Village =

Coordinates: 43.402°N 80.438°W

Ken Seiling Waterloo Region Museum and Doon Heritage Village (formerly Doon Pioneer Village from 1957 to 1985; and Doon Heritage Crossroads from 1985 to 2010)
- Established: 1957 and 2011
- Location: Kitchener, Ontario, Canada
- Type: history and living history museum
- Visitors: 90,000+ per annum
- Directors: Adele Hempel (2017-2020); Tom Reitz (1989-2016); David Newlands (1989); Marten Lewis (1983-1988)
- Public transit access: GRT #10, 201
- Website: official website

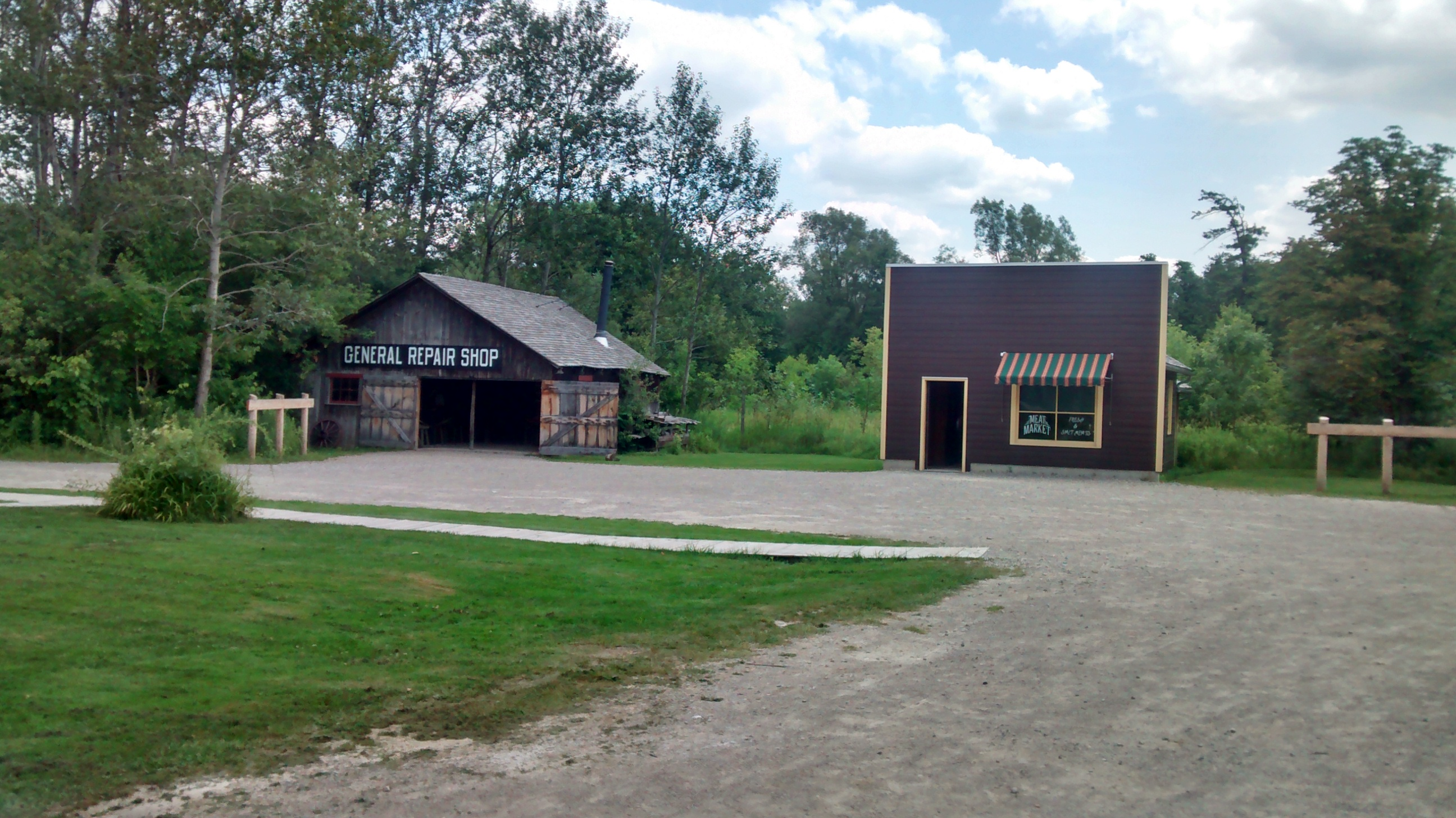
View of some of the living history buildings.

Doon Heritage Village, located at the Ken Seiling Waterloo Region Museum, is a picturesque 25-hectare (60-acre) living history village that shows visitors what life was like in the Waterloo Region in the year 1914. It is located in the former Doon village, now part of Kitchener, Ontario, Canada, next to Homer Watson Park.

The Doon Heritage Village is open seasonally from May to December. The Ken Seiling Waterloo Region Museum is open daily throughout the year, while the village is not open weekends in September, October and November. Doon Heritage Village re-opened after years of renovations on July 1st, 2026

The Doon Heritage Village recreates life in rural Waterloo County during the year 1914. It has more than 22 buildings on more than 24 hectares (60 acres). Some of these are restored buildings donated and relocated from across Waterloo Region and south-central Ontario, and some are reconstructions based on original buildings.

Buildings in the living history village include the Grand Trunk Railway's Petersburg station, Peter Martin House, Wagon Drive Shed and Barns, Detweiler Weavery, Dry Goods and Grocery Store, Harness Shop, Tailor Shop, Post Office, Sawmill, Blacksmith Shop, Meat Market, Repair Shop, Peter McArthur House, Seibert House, Sararas House, Bricker Barn, Freeport United Brethren in Christ Church, and Fire Hall.

The Doon Heritage Village, which has been in operation since 1957, and the nearby Ken Seiling Waterloo Region Museum, which opened in 2010, are owned and operated by the Regional Municipality of Waterloo.

== Ken Seiling Waterloo Region Museum ==
Construction of the new Waterloo Region Museum began in late 2007. The museum is located at the entrance to Doon Heritage Village and the building opened on May 1, 2010. The museum and exhibits were officially opened in November 2011. In November 2018 the Waterloo Region Museum campus was renamed the Ken Seiling Waterloo Region Museum in recognition of retiring Regional Chair Ken Seiling - honouring his 33 years serving as Regional Chair. The museum was designed by Moriyama + Teshima Architects.

== Programs of the Ken Seiling Waterloo Region Museum ==
Ken Seiling Waterloo Region Museum is a campus of historical attractions and preservation facilities, including the Doon Heritage Village, the Waterloo Region Hall of Fame, and the Waterloo Region Curatorial Centre. The campus of facilities is the largest community museum in Ontario.

The Ken Seiling Waterloo Region Museum is a 47,000 square foot museum, designed by Moriyama + Teshima Architects, Toronto. It is the first LEED certified (Silver) museum in Canada. The museum includes two exhibit galleries. The long term exhibit, What Makes Us Who We Are?, explores 12,000 years of the history and development of Waterloo Region, from First Peoples through the high tech sector of the early 21st century. A short term exhibit gallery is used for exhibits mounted by the museum from its own collection, and traveling exhibits from other museums on a variety of topics. The museum includes public amenities such as a gift shop, the 114 seat Christie Theatre, classrooms, outdoor patio/picnic space, and Hazels - a snack bar/cafe. The museum is open year round.

The Doon Heritage Village is set in 1914, in World War I. Living history programs bring to life the first 14 years of the 1900s. Hands-on activities take place throughout the year including vintage games, making ice cream and historic crafts led by costumed teacher/interpreters. Seasonal special events and programs are held throughout the village's eight-month season from May through December.

The Waterloo Region Hall of Fame is located on the second floor exhibit gallery of What Makes Us Who We Are? in the Ken Seiling Waterloo Region Museum. The Hall of Fame annually recognizes individuals and groups that have brought recognition of themselves and the community. More than 450 individuals, groups and sports teams have been inducted into the Hall since it opened in 1972.

The Waterloo Region Curatorial Centre is a 35,500 square foot preservation facility that supports the work of the museums owned and operated by the Region of Waterloo. Facilities include artifact storage, two conservation labs, an exhibit design studio, exhibit fabrication workshop, library and archives.

== History ==
=== 1950–1959 ===
- August 1952 - Dr. A.E. Dusty Broome returns from visiting the Nederlands Openluchtmuseum in Arnhem, the Netherlands with the idea that a similar museum should be developed in Waterloo County, Ontario.
- September 1953 - The Waterloo Historical Society passes a motion to strongly support the establishment of a Pioneer Village in Waterloo County.
- November 1953 - Cressman Woods in Kitchener, Ontario, part of the Old Cressman Farm of Isaac Cressman is identified as the preferred location for the village.
- December 1954 - First meeting of the Ontario Pioneer Community Foundation and election of board of directors.
- January 1956 - An initial parcel of land is purchased next to Homer Watson Memorial Park.
- August 1956 - The Province of Ontario grants the Ontario Pioneer Community Foundation its charter.
- June 19, 1957 - Doon Pioneer Village officially opens with a barn raising. The first peg is driven by the Honourable W.M. Nickle, Provincial Minister for Planning.
- June 1957 - An additional 43 acres (170,000 m^{2}) of land are purchased.

=== 1960–1969 ===
- June 1960 - Museum building officially opens.
- July 1961 - General Store opens with the financial assistance of A.R. Goudie
- 1962 - Freeport Church is moved to the site by cutting it in half.
- July 1963 - First live demonstration takes place featuring a blacksmith.
- July 1964 - CPR D10 locomotive 894 is moved to village.
- October 1967 - Recreated Waterloo Township Hall is opened as a Centennial Project in honour of Canada's 100th birthday.
- 1968 - Expansion of live exhibits with weaving, spinning and threshing demonstrations.
- September 1968 - Agreement with the Grand River Conservation Authority that they will have control over the village's land, and the Ontario Pioneer Community Foundation will have jurisdiction over the day-to-day operations of the village.

=== 1970–1979 ===
- 1970 - Agreement is reached that the Waterloo County Hall of Fame should be located at the village.
- April 1, 1971 - The Grand River Conservation Authority takes over payment of wages and other expenses at the village.
- 1971 - Electricity is installed throughout the village, servicing buildings and grounds.
- June 1972 - Opening of the Waterloo County Hall of Fame.
- January 1, 1973 - Regional Municipality of Waterloo is incorporated.
- 1974 - Waterloo Regional Heritage Foundation contributes $8,500 to purchase and move the Peter Martin House from Waterloo.
- 1976 to 1979 - The Ontario Pioneer Community Foundation holds its All Our Yesteryears fundraising campaign to raise money for development of the Doon Pioneer Village site.

=== 1980–1989 ===
- November 19, 1982 - At a Friends of Doon Luncheon, the key to the village is transferred from the Ontario Pioneer Community Foundation and the Grand River Conservation Authority to the Regional Municipality of Waterloo.
- January 1, 1983 - The Regional Municipality of Waterloo assumes ownership and operation of Doon Pioneer Village and Heritage Community.
- 1985 - The village's name is changed to Doon Heritage Crossroads and the mission is changed to reflect rural Waterloo Region in the year 1914.
- 1985 - The Ontario Pioneer Community Foundation donates $20,000 toward the restoration of the Dry Goods and Grocery Store.
- May 1988 - The Peter Martin House is opened to the public after a restoration project involving the Old Order Mennonite community in oral history, research and construction. Many of the tradespeople involved in the restoration are direct descendants of Peter Martin who built the house in 1820.

=== 1990–1999 ===
- 1990 - Livestock program is introduced with the addition of horses, cattle, sheep and fowl.
- 1990 - Heritage garden and seed saving program is introduced.
- 1993 - The Ontario Pioneer Community Foundation officially changes its name to The Friends of Doon Heritage Crossroads.
- 1994 - Doon Heritage Crossroads embarks on a five-year plan to improve access for visitors with disabilities.
- November 1995 - Waterloo Regional Curatorial Centre officially opens.

=== 2000–2009 ===
- 2000 - Grand Trunk Railway Petersburg station restored.
- 2004 - A blacksmith shop, modelled on an 1894 building located in the village of Conestogo, Ontario, is recreated in the village.
- 2006 - A new roadway is constructed in the living history village.
- 2006/2007 - CPR Engine 894 undergoes restoration.
- 2007 - Doon Heritage Crossroads celebrates its 50th anniversary.
- 2008 - Construction begins on the Region of Waterloo History Museum.
- 2009 - Restoration of the village's Butcher Shop, now Meat Market, and Seibert House.
- 2009 - Doon Heritage Crossroads name is changed to Doon Heritage Village.

=== 2010–2019 ===
- 2010 - Waterloo Region Museum opens, serving as the gateway to Doon Heritage Village. Designed by Moriyama + Teshima Architects, Toronto.
- 2011 - Waterloo Region Museum officially opens on November 12 including exhibit What Makes Us Who We Are? exploring 12,000 years of the Region's history.
- 2011 - Waterloo Region Hall of Fame, renamed from the Waterloo County Hall of Fame, opens in the new museum building
- 2012 - Coming of Age exhibit opens, exploring teenagers' lives from the 1920s through the early 2000s.
- 2013 - Construction of a greenhouse to support heritage gardens in Doon Heritage Village.
- 2015 - Demolition of a reproduction (1960s) Harness Shop and Print Shop in Doon Heritage Village, followed by construction of a new Harness Shop.
- 2015 - BEER! The Exhibit opens in the Waterloo Region Museum's feature exhibit gallery.
- 2016 - opening of new Harness Shop in Doon Heritage Village in May.
- 2016 - City on Edge exhibit, exploring the name change of the City of Berlin to Kitchener in 1916 in the museum's feature exhibit gallery.
- 2017 - Tyrannosaurs - Meet the Family, developed by the Australian Museum and travelled by Flying Fish, on exhibit in the museum's feature exhibit gallery.
- 2017 - Trailblazing - Women in Canada since 1867 exhibit opens in museum's feature exhibit gallery.
- 2018 - Canada: Day 1, produced by the Canadian Museum of Immigration at Pier 21, on exhibit in the museum's feature exhibit gallery.
- 2018 - Waterloo Region Museum is renamed the Ken Seiling Waterloo Region Museum.
- 2019 - Journey to Space, produced by the Science Museum of Minnesota and the California Science Center with support from NASA, on exhibit in the museum's feature exhibit gallery.
- 2019 - Going Places: Past Present Future exploring how the people of Waterloo Region have been actively on the move by water, road, rail and air on exhibit in the museum's feature exhibit gallery.

=== 2020–today ===
- 2020 - Mandela: Struggle for Freedom, on exhibit in the museum's feature exhibit gallery, developed by the Canadian Museum of Human Rights (Winnipeg, Canada), in partnership with the Apartheid Museum (Johannesburg, South Africa). Tour management services provided by Lord Cultural Resources.

== Collections ==
The Ken Seiling Waterloo Region Museum collection supports the 1914 living history village but also includes the Region of Waterloo’s local history collection, spanning from prehistory to the present day. The core collection numbers more than 50,000 artifacts and archival pieces; archaeological collections from across Waterloo Region number many hundreds of thousands of artifacts. Research collections are stored in the Region of Waterloo Curatorial Centre, located on the museum's property.

== Citations ==
Tivy, Mary. The Local History Museum In Ontario: An Intellectual History, 1851-1985. PhD Thesis, University of Waterloo, Waterloo, Ontario, 2006.

Region of Waterloo. History's Home for 40 Years - Doon Heritage Crossroads, 1957-1997. Region of Waterloo, Kitchener, Ontario, 1997.

Region of Waterloo. Doon Heritage Crossroads Visitor Guide. Region of Waterloo, Kitchener, Ontario, 1993 (revised 2005).

== Affiliations ==
The museum is affiliated with: CMA Canadian Museums Association, CHIN, and Virtual Museum of Canada, OMA Ontario Museum Association, ALHFAM (Association for Living History, Farm and Agricultural Museums), AAM (American Alliance of Museums) and many other professional, marketing and trade associations.

== See also ==
- Open-air museum
- Museum
