= Thomas Farquhar =

Canadian politician

The Honourable Thomas Farquhar
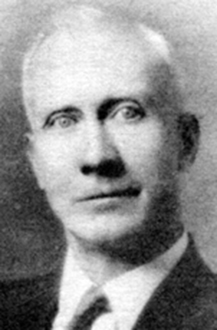

Canadian Senator from Ontario
- In office 10 September 1948 – 27 September 1962
- Appointed by: W. L. Mackenzie King

Member of Parliament for Algoma East
- In office 14 October 1935 – 9 September 1948
- Preceded by: George Nicholson
- Succeeded by: Lester B. Pearson

Member of the Ontario Provincial Parliament for Manitoulin
- In office 1 December 1926 – 29 October 1929
- Preceded by: Beniah Bowman
- Succeeded by: Alvin Edwin Graham

7th Mayor of Sault Ste. Marie, Ontario
- In office 1920–1922
- Preceded by: George Boyd
- Succeeded by: James Dawson

Personal details
- Born: 28 January 1875 Barrie, Ontario, Canada
- Died: 24 December 1962 (aged 87)
- Party: Liberal

Thomas Farquhar (28 January 1875 – 24 December 1962) was a Canadian politician and businessman from northern Ontario. Farquhar was active in municipal politics in Sault Ste. Marie, Ontario serving the city’s seventh mayor from 1920 to 1922. He represented Manitoulin in the Legislative Assembly of Ontario from 1926 to 1929 and represented the federal riding of Algoma East in the House of Commons from 1943 to 1948.

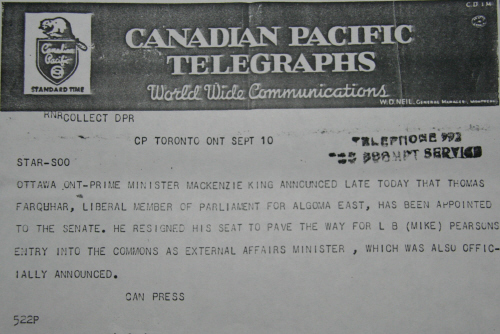
A September 1948 telegraph from Canadian Press, reporting on Farquhar's appointment to the Senate.

In 1948, Farquhar accepted an appointment to the Senate which allowed Prime Minister William Lyon Mackenzie King’s Minister of External Affairs, and future Prime Minister Lester B. Pearson the opportunity to be elected to the House of Commons in a by-election in the Algoma East riding.

In 1945 Farquhar founded a family-owned dairy on Manitoulin Island that today operates as Farquhar’s Dairy Limited.

== Life and early work ==
Farquhar was the third of ten children of William and Jane (née Nixon) Farquhar. He was born on 28 January 1875 on a farm near Allandale, now Barrie, Ontario in Simcoe County. In 1877 the family moved to a farm near Kagawong on Manitoulin Island where Farquhar was educated.

In 1896, he travelled west to British Columbia's Slocan Valley where he mined several claims and became a prominent member of the Western Federation of Miners, serving one year as president of the union.

In 1903, Farquhar returned to Manitoulin to take up the family farm. Five years later he moved to Sault Ste. Marie to work at his father's meat business. After a stint in real estate, he and a partner purchased the Star Clothing Company at Queen and Gore Streets where he became a successful merchant.

== Political career ==
Farquhar was active in public life in Sault Ste. Marie and Manitoulin Island. After serving as secretary-treasurer of the public school board from 1915 to 1916, he was acclaimed as a city alderman in 1918 and won election in 1919.

In the 1920 municipal election, local labour leaders persuaded Farquhar to run for mayor. He defeated then-mayor George Boyd, and was re-elected with a large plurality in 1921. He was renominated for the office in 1922 but declined to run against Boyd and James Dawson.

Farquhar was a candidate for the Progressive Party in Algoma West in the 1921 federal election but finished third with 27 per cent of the vote.

In 1922 he sold his clothing business to purchase a farm in Mindemoya on Manitoulin Island. Never far from public life, Farquhar served as the reeve of Carnarvon Township on Manitoulin from 1922 to 1925.

In 1926, Farquhar entered provincial politics and was elected to represent Manitoulin in the Legislative Assembly of Ontario as a United Farmers member. He sought re-election in 1929 as a Liberal but was defeated.

Farquhar's longest continual service would be in federal politics. In the 1935 general election he was elected to the House of Commons under the Liberal banner, representing the riding of Algoma East. He was subsequently re-elected on 26 March 1940 and 11 June 1945.

On 10 September 1948, Prime Minister William Lyon Mackenzie King appointed Farquhar to the Senate so that his new Minister of External Affairs Lester B. Pearson could contest the by-election in the relatively safe Liberal riding of Algoma East and enter the House of Commons.

In 1955 Farqhuar sponsored legislation in the Senate to create the St. Mary's River Bridge Company to facilitate the eventual construction of the International Bridge between Sault Ste. Marie, Ontario and Sault Ste. Marie, Michigan.

In 1960, Farquhar suffered a severe stroke. He resigned from the Senate on 27 September 1962 at the age of 87.

== Other work ==
In 1935, Farquhar went into the dairy business, eventually buying the dairy in Little Current. Farquhar's Dairy continues to operate as an independent dairy company in Northeastern Ontario. In 1945, he and his sons founded Thos. Farquhar & Sons Co. Limited. He was also a director for a mine in Gatineau, Quebec.

== Personal life & family ==
Farqhuar married Kathleen Wiber on Manitoulin Island on June 1, 1907. She died six months later on December 18, 1907.

He married his second wife, Kathleen's younger sister, Florence Amy Wiber in Little Current on Manitoulin Island in October 1914. The couple had five children: Stanley, Ruth, Thomas, John and Allan.

His first son, Stanley, would follow his father's career path into public service, representing the riding of Algoma—Manitoulin in the Legislative Assembly of Ontario from 1963 to 1971.

== Death and memorials ==
Three months after his resignation from the Senate, Farquhar died at his home in Kagawong, Manitoulin Island on 24 December 1962 at the age of 87. He was interred in Mindemoya Cemetery on the island. His wife Amy died in November 1964. Both are memorialized in a stained glass window at Little Current United Church, in Little Current, Ontario.
