= George Horne Russell =

Canadian painter

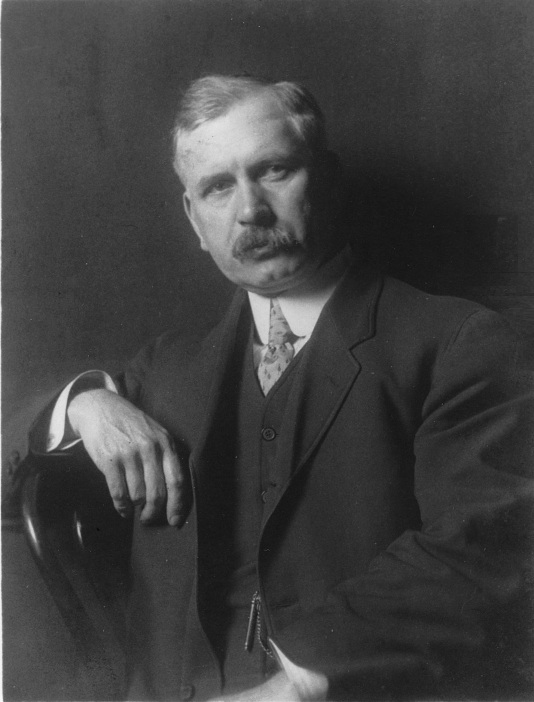
- Born: April 18, 1861; Banff, Aberdeenshire, Scotland
- Died: June 25, 1933 (aged 72); St. Stephen, New Brunswick, Canada
- Education: Aberdeen School of Art and the South Kensington School of Art
- Known for: painter
- Spouse: Elizabeth Morrison

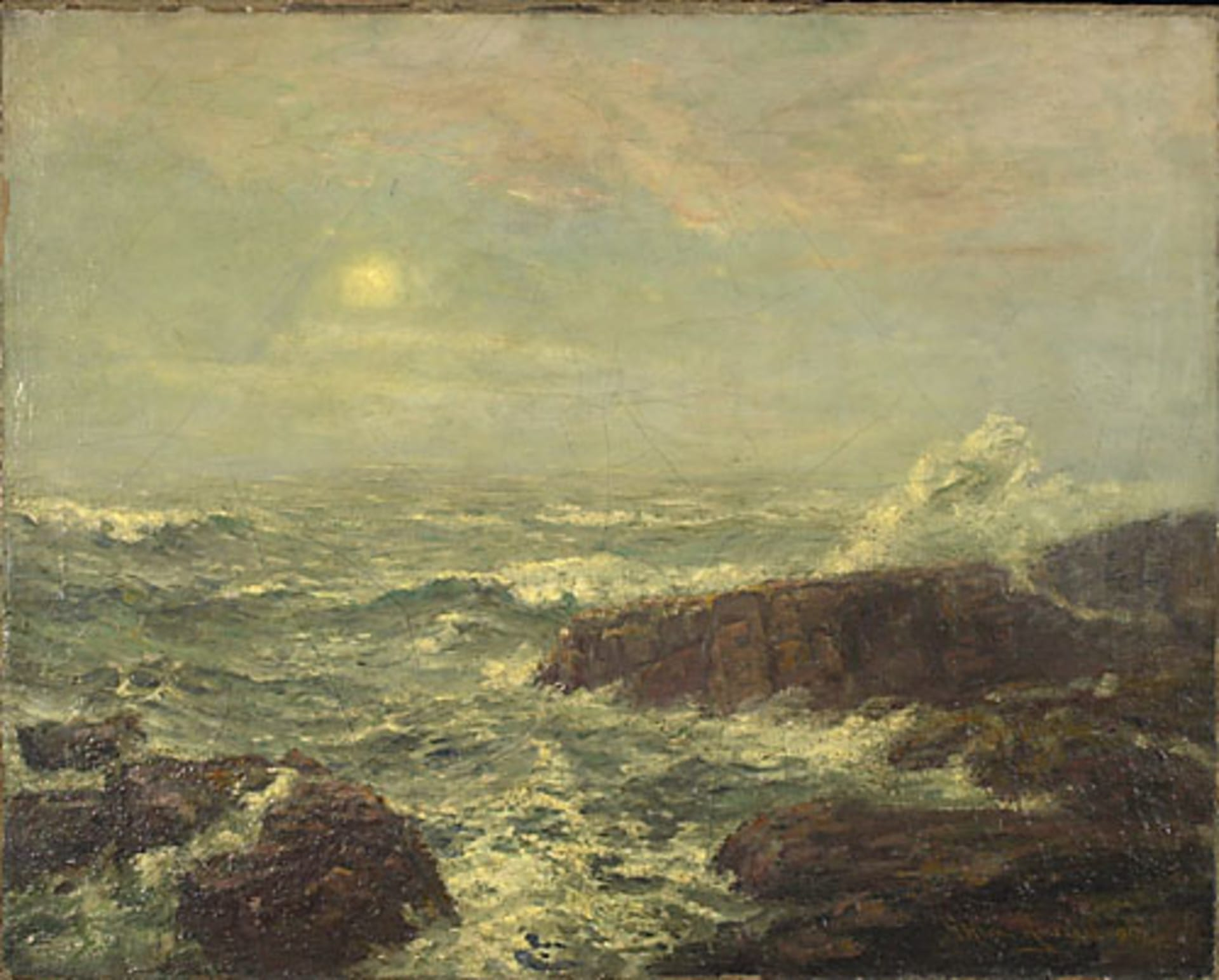
After a storm (1915), Musée national des beaux-arts du Québec

George Horne Russell (or G. Horne Russell by which he was known) RCA (April 18, 1861 – June 25, 1933) was a Scottish-born Canadian painter.

== Career ==
Born in Banff, Aberdeenshire, Scotland, he studied at the Aberdeen School of Art and the South Kensington School of Art. He came to Canada in 1889 on invitation, settling in Montreal where he established a studio and painted portraits of many noted and well-to-do Canadians. By 1900 he was painting large scenes of the Rockies for the Canadian Pacific Railway. He was a close friend of Sir William Van Horne. It was probably Van Horne along with other wealthy Montrealers who vacationed annually at St. Andrews, N.B., who persuaded Russell to locate a summer home and studio there.

In 1926 in Montreal he held his first solo show at the Watson Art Gallery. He was considered a major maritime painter. His work is included in the following collections: National Gallery of Canada; the Glenbow-Alberta Institute; the Art Gallery of Ontario, and in many other public and private collections, including the Canadian Club, New York. From 1922 to 1926, he was the president of the Royal Canadian Academy of Arts.

Cultural offices
| Preceded by Homer Watson | President of the Royal Canadian Academy of Arts; 1922-1926 | Succeeded by Henry Sproatt |
