= George Nicholson (politician) =

Canadian merchant and politician (1868–1935)

George B. Nicholson

Member of Parliament for Algoma East
- In office December 1917 – December 1921
- Preceded by: William Ross Smyth
- Succeeded by: John Carruthers

Member of Parliament for Algoma East
- In office October 1925 – September 1926
- Preceded by: John Carruthers
- Succeeded by: Beniah Bowman

Member of Parliament for Algoma East
- In office July 1930 – January 1935
- Preceded by: Beniah Bowman
- Succeeded by: Thomas Farquhar

Personal details
- Born: George Brecken Nicholson; 17 March 1868 Crapaud, Prince Edward Island, Canada
- Died: 1 January 1935 (aged 66) Toronto, Ontario, Canada
- Party: Unionist; Conservative
- Spouse(s): Charlotte A Weller m. 26 September 1894 (died); Margaret W. Keefer m. 7 December 1929
- Profession: lumber merchant

George Brecken Nicholson (17 March 1868 – 1 January 1935) was a Canadian businessman and politician. Nicholson served as a Conservative and Unionist member of the House of Commons of Canada. He was born in Crapaud, Prince Edward Island and became a lumber merchant.

Nicholson attended public and grammar schools at Prince Edward Island and Nova Scotia. In 1884, he joined the Canadian Pacific Railway for construction work, remaining in that job until 1901. Nicholson was established in northern Ontario by the end of the 19th century. In business, he was part of the lumber firm Austin and Nicholson and became president and secretary-treasurer of the McNaught Lumber company. Nicholson was also a director of the Excelsior Life Insurance company.

He was first elected to Parliament as a supporter of Sir Robert Borden's wartime Union Government in Algoma East riding during the 1917 general election. After serving one term, he was a Conservative candidate in the 1921 election but was defeated by John Carruthers of the Liberals. Nicholson returned to the House of Commons when he defeated Carruthers in the 1925 election. After another term in Parliament, Nicholson again lost his Algoma East seat to Beniah Bowman of the United Farmers of Ontario in the 1926 election. Nicholson won the seat back again in the 1930 federal election by defeating Bowman who by that time became a Liberal candidate.

Nicholson was at his old Chapleau residence when he sustained a stroke. He was admitted to Toronto General Hospital where he died the following day, on 1 January 1935, before the end of his term in the 17th Canadian Parliament.
