= John Alexander Boyd =

Canadian lawyer and judge

Sir John Alexander Boyd KCMG
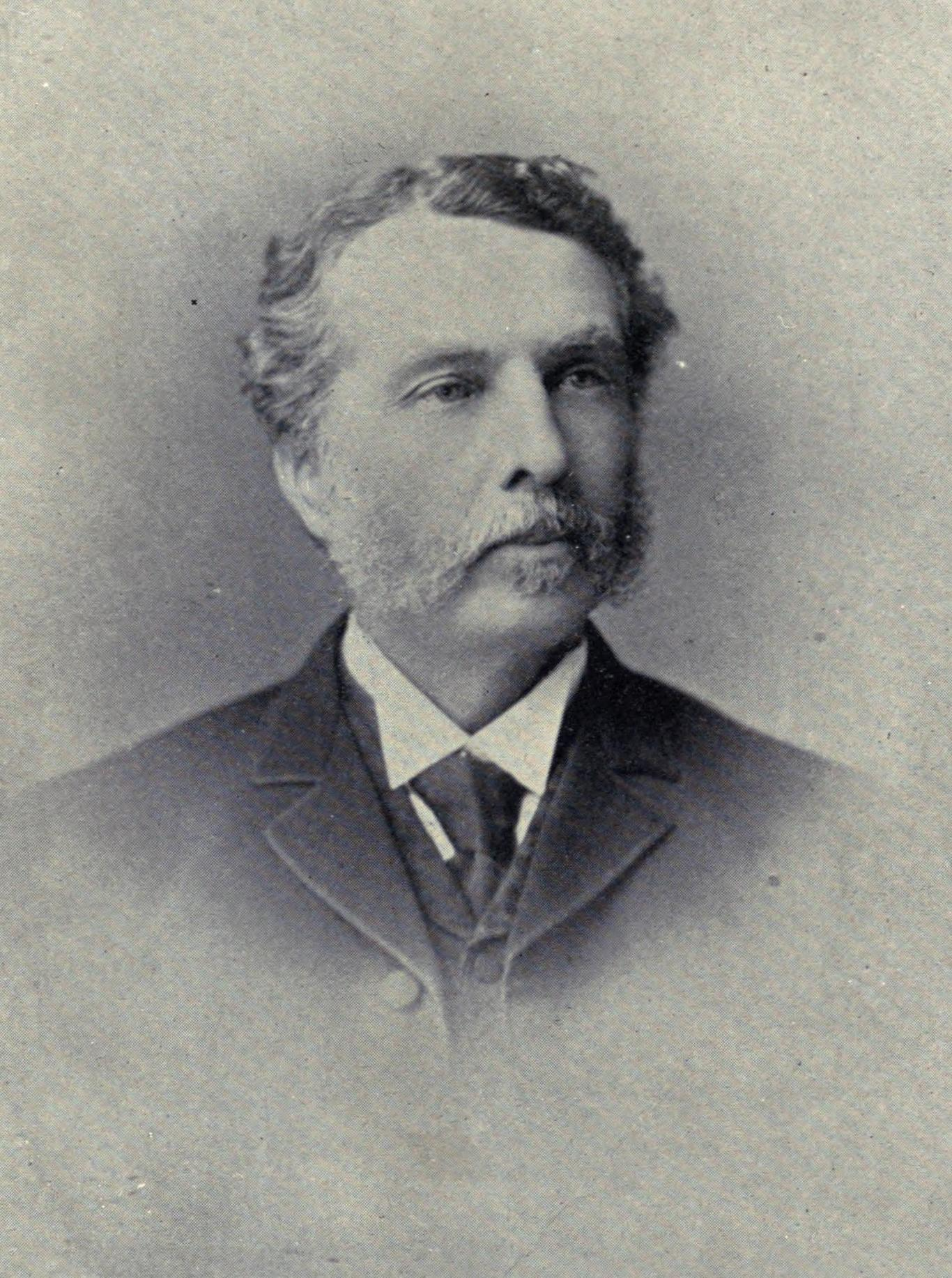
- Born: April 23, 1837; Toronto, Upper Canada
- Died: November 23, 1916 (aged 79); Toronto, Ontario, Canada

Sir John Alexander Boyd KCMG (April 23, 1837 – November 23, 1916) was a Canadian lawyer and judge.

John Alexander Boyd was born in Toronto on April 23, 1837. Educated at Upper Canada College and the University of Toronto, Boyd began his career in 1860 when he was articled to David Breakenridge Read.

Boyd was Chancellor of the High Court of Justice of the Province of Ontario, the last chancellor before common law and equity were fused in the province. His term as chancellor began on May 3, 1881. Boyd wrote the trial decision in St Catharines Milling and Lumber Co v R, in which he ruled for Ontario, rejecting the concept of Aboriginal title.

He was appointed a Knight Commander of the Order of St Michael and St George (KCMG) during the visit to Canada of TRH the Duke and Duchess of Cornwall and York (later King George V and Queen Mary) in October 1901.

In 1903, Boyd and William Glenholme Falconbridge were appointed to a royal commission to investigate charges of bribery brought forward by Robert Roswell Gamey against the Liberal Government of the time. Although the commission found no proof for these allegations, the provincial Conservatives won the general election that followed two years later.

== Sources ==
- Drake, Karen (March 5, 2018). "The Impact of St Catharines Milling". Canada at 150: The Charter and the Constitution. Irwin Law; Law Society of Ontario. pp. 618–638. ISBN 978-1-55221-474-9. OCLC 1030771940.
