= William Ross Smyth =

Canadian politician

Member of Parliament for Algoma East
- In office 1908–1817
- Preceded by: Albert Dyment
- Succeeded by: George Nicholson

Ontario MPP
- In office 1902–1908
- Preceded by: Riding re-established
- Succeeded by: Albert Grigg
- Constituency: Algoma

Personal details
- Born: January 3, 1857 Thomroam, Tarves, Aberdeenshire, Scotland
- Died: September 7, 1932 (aged 75)
- Party: Conservative
- Spouse: Nancy Burden (m. 1879)
- Occupation: Businessman

Military service
- Allegiance: Canadian
- Branch/service: Canadian Expeditionary Force
- Years of service: 1914-1918
- Rank: Colonel
- Unit: 238th Battalion
- Awards: Commander, Order of the British Empire

William Ross Smyth CBE (January 3, 1857 – September 7, 1932) was an Ontario merchant and political figure. He represented Algoma in the Legislative Assembly of Ontario from 1902 to 1908 and Algoma East in the House of Commons of Canada from 1908 to 1917 as a Conservative member.

He was born in Thomroam, Tarves, Aberdeenshire, Scotland, the son of Francis Smyth. In 1879, he married Nancy Burden. Smyth was a lumber merchant. He was also president of the Nancy Helen Mine. He led the 238th Battalion of the Canadian Expeditionary Force during World War I. He was appointed a Commander of the Order of the British Empire in the 1919 New Year Honours.
