= 238th Battalion, CEF =

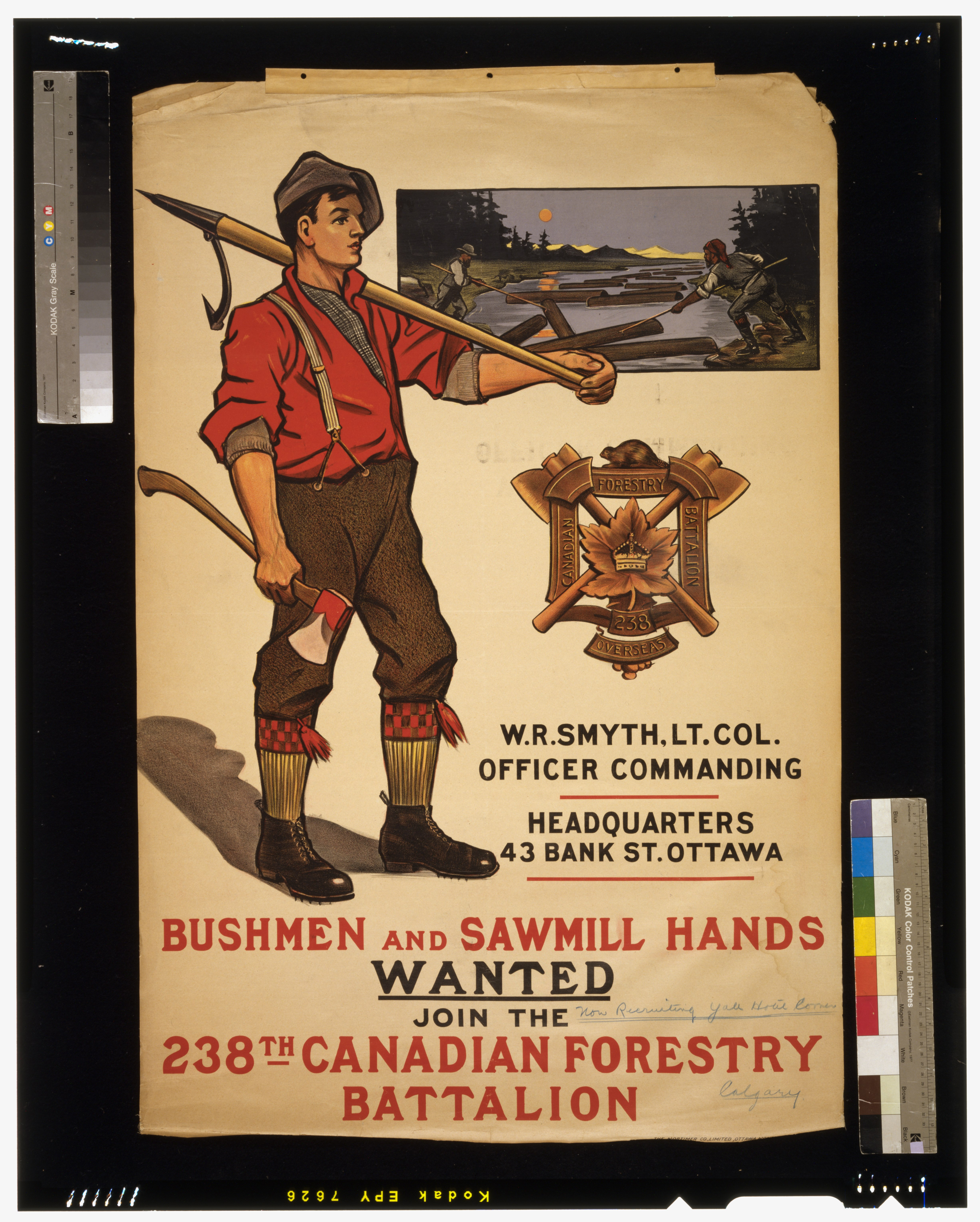
Bushmen and sawmill hands wanted. Join the 238th Canadian Forestry Battalion

The 238th Battalion, CEF was a unit in the Canadian Expeditionary Force during the First World War. Based in Ottawa, Ontario, the unit began recruiting in the Spring of 1916 throughout Ontario and the Western provinces. After sailing to England in September 1916, the battalion became the 14th Company, Canadian Forestry Corps. The 238th Battalion, CEF had one Officer Commanding: Lieut-Col. W. R. Smyth.
