= Algoma East =

Former federal electoral district in Ontario, Canada

Ontario electoral district

Defunct federal electoral district
- Legislature: House of Commons
- District created: 1903
- District abolished: 1966
- First contested: 1904
- Last contested: 1965

Algoma East was a federal electoral district in Ontario, Canada, that was represented in the House of Commons of Canada from 1904 to 1968. It was created in 1903 from parts of Algoma riding.

It initially consisted of the territorial district of Manitoulin and the part of the territorial district of Algoma lying east of a line drawn from south to north along the limit between the townships of Lefroy and Plummer Additional and due north to the northern limit of Algoma.

In 1904, the territorial district of Manitoulin was transferred out of the riding.

In 1914, it was redefined to consist of the eastern part of the territorial district of Algoma, excluding those parts included in Timiskaming, the western part of the territorial district of Sudbury, and the territorial district of Manitoulin

In 1933, it was redefined to consist of the territorial district of Manitoulin, and the parts of the territorial districts of Algoma and Sudbury.

The electoral district was abolished in 1966 when it was redistributed between Algoma, Nickel Belt and Timmins—Chapleau ridings.

Its last, longest-serving, and highest-profile MP was Lester Pearson of the Liberal Party, who was Prime Minister of Canada from 1963 to 1968.

== Members of Parliament ==
This riding elected the following members of the House of Commons of Canada:

Parliament	Years	Member	Party
Riding created from Algoma
10th	1904–1908	Albert Dyment	Liberal
11th	1908–1911	William Ross Smyth	Conservative
12th	1911–1917	William Ross Smyth	Conservative
13th	1917–1921	George Nicholson	Government (Unionist)
14th	1921–1925	John Carruthers	Liberal
15th	1925–1926	George Nicholson	Conservative
16th	1926–1930	Beniah Bowman	United Farmers of Ontario
17th	1930–1935	George Nicholson	Conservative
18th	1935–1940	Thomas Farquhar	Liberal
19th	1940–1945	Thomas Farquhar	Liberal
20th	1945–1948	Thomas Farquhar	Liberal
20th	1948–1949	Lester B. Pearson	Liberal
21st	1949–1953	Lester B. Pearson	Liberal
22nd	1953–1957	Lester B. Pearson	Liberal
23rd	1957–1958	Lester B. Pearson	Liberal
24th	1958–1962	Lester B. Pearson	Liberal
25th	1962–1963	Lester B. Pearson	Liberal
26th	1963–1965	Lester B. Pearson	Liberal
27th	1965–1968	Lester B. Pearson	Liberal
Riding dissolved into Algoma, Nickel Belt and Timmins—Chapleau

== Election results ==
1904 Canadian federal election
Party	Candidate	Votes
Liberal	Albert Dyment	2,698
Conservative	Byron H. Turner	2,120

1908 Canadian federal election
Party	Candidate	Votes
Conservative	William Ross Smyth	2,849
Liberal	Albert Dyment	2,808

1911 Canadian federal election
Party	Candidate	Votes
Conservative	William Ross Smyth	3,898
Liberal	John Lionel Regan	3,716

1917 Canadian federal election
Party	Candidate	Votes
Government (Unionist)	George Nicholson	4,742
Opposition (Laurier Liberals)	Lawrence O'Connor	3,596

1921 Canadian federal election
Party	Candidate	Votes
Liberal	John Carruthers	5,007
Conservative	George Nicholson	4,194
Progressive	John Egerton Wright	3,095

1925 Canadian federal election
Party	Candidate	Votes
Conservative	George Nicholson	6,209
Liberal	John Carruthers	5,665

1926 Canadian federal election
Party	Candidate	Votes
United Farmers of Ontario	Beniah Bowman	6,909
Conservative	George Nicholson	6,143

1930 Canadian federal election
Party	Candidate	Votes
Conservative	George Nicholson	7,231
Liberal	Beniah Bowman	6,934

1935 Canadian federal election
Party	Candidate	Votes
Liberal	Thomas Farquhar	5,816
Conservative	William James Card	2,541
Co-operative Commonwealth	Kenneth James Webb Bromley	1,362
Reconstruction	Isadore Ernest Provencher	833

1940 Canadian federal election
Party	Candidate	Votes
Liberal	Thomas Farquhar	5,565
National Government	John Lorne Campbell	3,126
Co-operative Commonwealth	J. W. McVey	1,635

1945 Canadian federal election
Party	Candidate	Votes
Liberal	Thomas Farquhar	4,855
Progressive Conservative	Allan McNiece Austin	3,610
Co-operative Commonwealth	William Luke Strain	1,468

Canadian federal by-election, 25 October 1948 On Thomas Farquhar being called to the Senate, 10 September 1948
Party	Candidate	Votes
Liberal	Lester B. Pearson	4,685
Co-operative Commonwealth	Lorne D. Callaghan	2,382
Social Credit	John J. Fitzgerald	1,236

1949 Canadian federal election
Party	Candidate	Votes
Liberal	Lester B. Pearson	6,184
Progressive Conservative	Grant H. Turner	2,908
Co-operative Commonwealth	George Thornton	2,202

1953 Canadian federal election
Party	Candidate	Votes
Liberal	Lester B. Pearson	7,494
Progressive Conservative	George H. Bishop	3,877

1957 Canadian federal election
Party	Candidate	Votes
Liberal	Lester B. Pearson	8,574
Progressive Conservative	H. Merton Mulligan	5,757
Co-operative Commonwealth	Martin S. Reid	2,156

1958 Canadian federal election
Party	Candidate	Votes
Liberal	Lester B. Pearson	11,240
Progressive Conservative	Basil Scully	8,208
Co-operative Commonwealth	Walter James Corbett	2,309

1962 Canadian federal election
Party	Candidate	Votes
Liberal	Lester B. Pearson	11,934
Progressive Conservative	Alex Berthelot	5,631
New Democratic	Cam Cork	3,168

1963 Canadian federal election
Party	Candidate	Votes
Liberal	Lester B. Pearson	10,817
Progressive Conservative	Paul Jewell	6,146
Social Credit	Irénée John Quenneville	2,016
New Democratic	Bennett Donahue	1,751

1965 Canadian federal election
Party	Candidate	Votes
Liberal	Lester B. Pearson	9,268
Progressive Conservative	Joel Aldred	5,793
New Democratic	Walter Stuart	2,053

== See also ==
- List of Canadian electoral districts
- Historical federal electoral districts of Canada

Parliament of Canada
Preceded by Prince Albert	Constituency represented by the prime minister 1963-1968	Succeeded by Mount Royal
