= Doon, Ontario =

- Suburban community
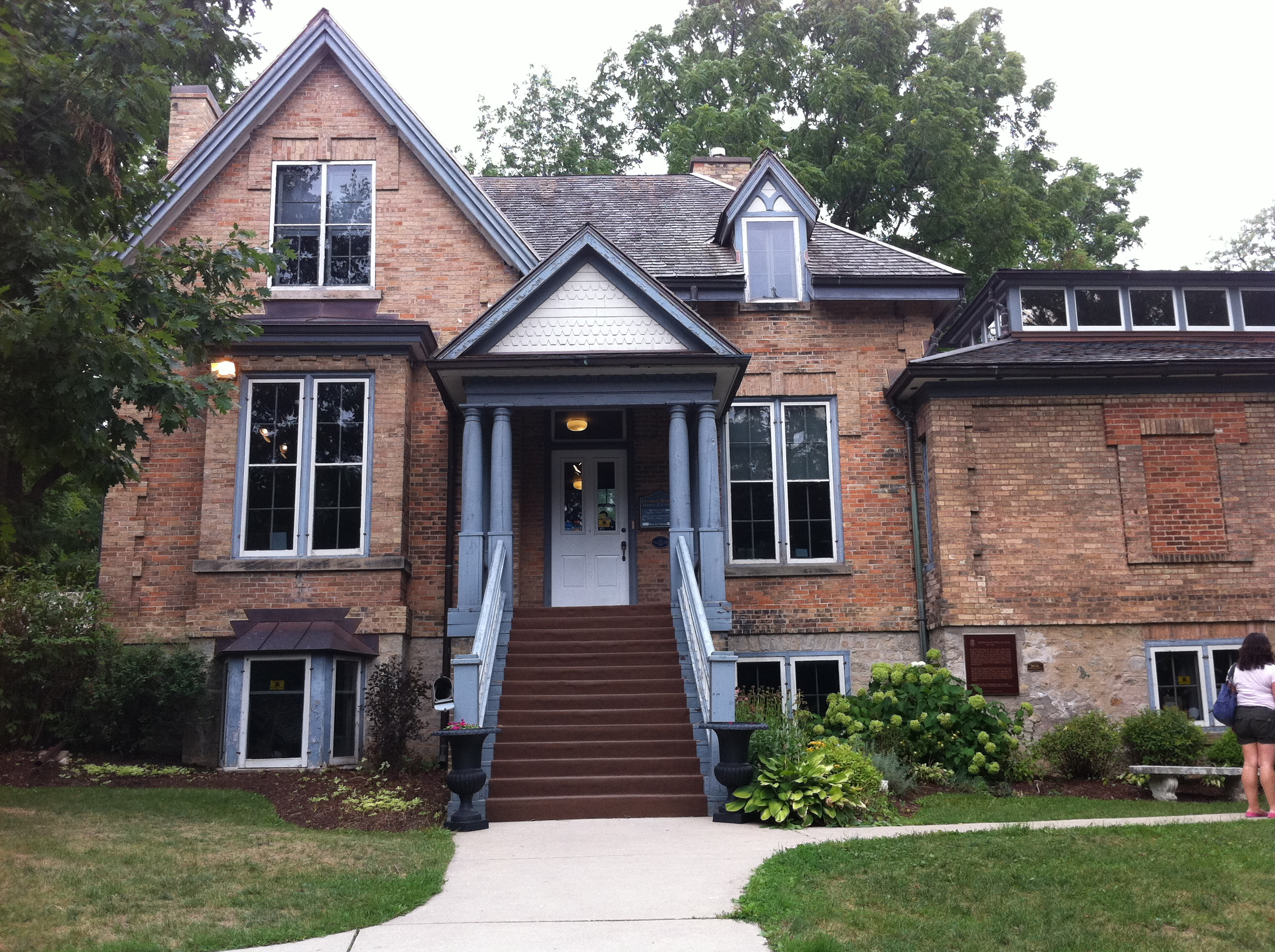
- Homer Watson House / Doon School of Fine Arts

- Location within Regional Municipality of Waterloo Location within Southern Ontario Location within Canada
- Coordinates: 43.392173°N 80.414304°W
- Country: Canada
- Province: Ontario
- City: Kitchener
- Settled: c. 1800
- Time zone: UTC-5 (EST)
  - Summer (DST): UTC-4 (EDT)

Doon is a suburban community and former village which is now a part of the city of Kitchener, Ontario, Canada. Doon was settled around 1800 by German Mennonites from Pennsylvania, and after 1830 by Scottish immigrants. The area is located at the confluence of Schneider Creek and the Grand River. The post office was opened in 1845. A large flour mill, oatmeal mill, distillery and sawmill were built on the Doon River over the following years. The Perine brothers established extensive linen works and flax mills near the settlement. By 1870, there was a single church, Presbyterian, a variety of tradesmen and a population of 200.

Although never large, at one time it was a bustling community with sawmills, a rope factory and other businesses.

It is known as the lifetime home of landscape artist Homer Watson. It is now a suburb of Kitchener, Ontario, home to the Doon Heritage Village and the main campus of Conestoga College.

== History ==
=== Origins ===
Doon was established in a forested area around Schneider Creek where it enters the Grand River from the south. Richard Beasley sold 3,600 acres (1,500 ha) of this land to John Biehn Sr. of Montgomery County, Pennsylvania, in 1800. Biehn's relatives bought portions of this land, and started to clear it for farming, His son John Biehn Jr. built a sawmill in what became Doon, and Frederic Beck also ran a sawmill in the area. Most of the early settlers were German Mennonite farmers from Pennsylvania.

=== Growth ===
In the 1830s the Ferrie family moved to the area, where they established several businesses in what is now Lower Doon including a distillery, tavern, general store, saw mill, cooperage, blacksmith shop and kiln. They also built workers' houses. Adam Ferrie Jr. gave Doon its name after Loch Doon and the River Doon in Ayrshire, Scotland. From this time most of the settlers were artisans, millers and brick makers of Scottish and English background. Doon Mills, driven by water, was fully operational in 1839, grinding oatmeal, flour, and barley for the local population. The population of Doon in 1855 was 200. A population of 200 was also listed in 1869.

The hamlets to the west, about a mile further up Schneider Creek, were originally called Oregon and Tow Town. They later merged and were called Upper Doon. James Watson, grandfather of the painter Homer Watson, set up a sawmill, carding and fulling mill and a pail factory in Oregon. John Tilt had a small sawmill and an enterprise for clay brick and tile manufacture, also in Oregon.

In Tow Town, Moses and Joseph Perine established a sawmill and a flax mill that made rope and twine, the first in Canada of this nature. The Doon Twine and Cordage factory opened in 1856 making products from locally-grown flax and hemp. Products included tying twines, plow lines, halter ropes, clothes lines and broom twine. Farmers were later banned from growing hemp because of its cannabis content. There was also a decline in local production of flax, so the factory had to import both of these raw materials.

New businesses served the growing population. By the early 1890s there was a post office, grocer and baker, two tailors, a cooper, blacksmith, shoemaker, wagon maker, bridge builder and scissors manufacturer. By the end of the 19th century visitors could stay in the Red Lion Inn, Doon Hotel or the Bush Inn, all respectable establishments.

A non-denominational Sunday School was founded in 1848. In 1854 the Doon Presbyterian Church was opened on land donated by Robert Ferrie and built with his financial assistance. A Methodist church was built in 1868 on a site donated by William Allen. The Bonnie Doon School was the first public school, opened in 1878 with one room, and extended to two rooms within ten years as the student population grew. The school burned down and was replaced in 1956. The Christadelphians built a church on Old Mill Road, formerly Richmond Street, in 1880. In 1889 it was clad in red brick. The church was used until 1916. The building was closed until 1936, then used as a residence until 1971. It was torn down in 1981.

=== Railway history ===
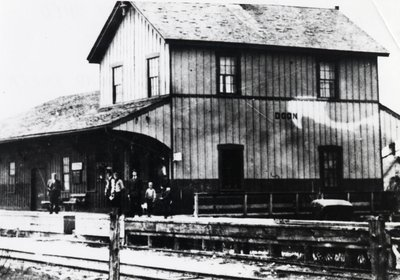
The Grand Trunk Railway station and freight shed c. 1900.

Railways began being constructed in Waterloo County during the early 1850s. The Grand Trunk Railway's east–west mainline was constructed to the north of Doon through Berlin, which by then had become the county seat. The Great Western Railway, a major competitor of the Grand Trunk, built a set of branch lines managed by a complex set of subsidiary companies northward from a point on its own mainline at Harrisburg, in what has been described as both Canada's first railway junction and its first branch line. The Great Western opened to Galt in 1854, with extensions already planned to Guelph via Preston and Hespeler (the Galt and Guelph Railway) and Berlin via Preston.

The Preston and Berlin Railway (a de facto subsidiary of the Great Western), which opened in 1857, provided Doon's first railway service, but it was short-lived due to the collapse of its bridge over the Grand River. Cut off from the rest of the Great Western system, the section on the west bank of the river (which passed through Doon and German Mills on the way to its junction with the Grand Trunk mainline at Berlin) was more useful to the Grand Trunk than the Great Western, and came under Grand Trunk ownership in 1865, becoming the Grand Trunk's Doon Branch. After campaigning from Galt town boosters, the Doon Branch was extended to Galt once again in 1873, along a new route through Blair, which bypassed Preston.

The line through Doon saw a mix of freight and passenger traffic, and a particular train was known locally as the "Dutch Mail" for its mail car. In 1914, scheduled daily trains were two southbound trains to Galt and two northbound trains through Berlin to Elmira, which carried passengers, baggage, mail, and express parcels. Information on freight movement is less available, but the station at Doon had a stockyard and freight shed. Before its destruction by fire in 1915, the Doon twine and cordage mill was a major freight customer. Decades later, it was claimed that up to eight trains passed through the village per day. The Doon line and station became a part of the Canadian National Railways system in 1923 along with the rest of the former Grand Trunk system. In the 1930s, amidst the Great Depression, passenger service ended on the line and the Doon and Blair stations were closed. Freight service continued and was dieselized in the 1950s along with the rest of the Canadian National system.

One of the last uses for the line through Doon was the movement of construction materials for Highway 401. For a short time during this period, there was a level crossing with the highway, which at the time had four lanes. Canadian National applied for abandonment of the line around 1956, and the rails were removed in stages: between Galt and the Doon Pioneer Village museum in 1961, then between the museum and Parkway (the former German Mills station) in 1964, the same year the museum received its former Canadian Pacific heritage steam locomotive. On the former Grand Trunk mainline, the Petersburg station was closed in 1967, and in 1968 it was transported to the Pioneer Village.

== Transportation ==
=== Rail ===
Rail service arrived in Doon in 1857 in the form of the Preston and Berlin Railway, a branch line of the Great Western Railway. It later became a part of the Grand Trunk Railway and, finally, the Canadian National Railway (CN). With the decline of large, rail-served industries in the area, CN applied to abandon the railway around 1956.

=== Road ===
Doon is immediately adjacent to Highway 401, which is to its east. Regional Road 28 passes through Doon, where it is known as Homer Watson Boulevard until becoming Fountain Street South within Cambridge.

=== Public transit ===
Conestoga College's Doon Campus is a minor hub for Grand River Transit bus service. Buses use the internal campus roadway to reach stops on the campus, including a row of bus bays. With internal traffic congestion on the campus increasing, a dedicated on-campus bus station has been proposed, which would be directly accessible from Doon Valley Drive, a public roadway. In 2020, it was announced that the Ontario Ministry of Infrastructure, Infrastructure Canada, and the Region of Waterloo would be committing funds to the project, alongside nine other public transit and active transportation infrastructure projects in the region. The planned bus station would include heated shelters, bicycle parking, and space for additional bus stops.

== Notable residents ==
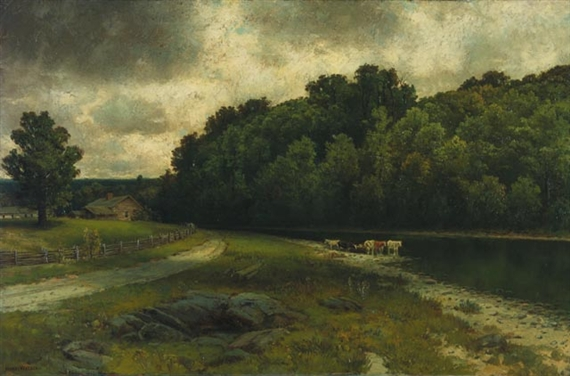
On the Grand River at Doon by Homer Watson (1880).

Moses Springer (1824–1898) was born in Doon on 31 August 1824. In 1834 he and his ten siblings were orphaned when their parents died in a cholera epidemic. He was raised in Hespeler by the Mennonite Bishop Joseph Hagey and became a teacher and later a businessman in Waterloo. He was reeve of the village of Waterloo three times between 1857 and 1875, and represented the North Waterloo riding in the Ontario Legislature from 1867 to 1881.

Homer Watson (1855–1936) was a self-taught painter who devoted most of his life to painting landscapes of the country of Doon in a combination of romantic and realistic styles. Oscar Wilde called Watson "the Canadian Constable". A field stone house, built in 1835, that lies south of the village was Watson's house from 1881 until his death in 1936. Homer's sister Phoebe Amelia Watson moved into Homer's house after his wife Roxanna died in 1918. She became curator of the Homer Watson Art Gallery in Doon, and held this post until her death on 22 October 1947.

Hartman Krug (1853–1933) was born in New Dundee and followed his father's profession as a fine furniture maker. He moved to Berlin and founded the H. Krug Furniture Company in the 1887. In 1912 Krug became the majority shareholder in Doon Twine and Cordage Company, which was renamed Doon Twines Ltd. The company began manufacturing cordage with jute, manila, hemp and sisal. To accommodate growth and reduce transportation costs, in 1916 the operation was moved from Doon to a larger factory in Kitchener.

Beniah Bowman (1886–1941) was born in Waterloo county into a United Empire Loyalist family. He was educated in the Doon and Hespeler public schools. In 1911 he became a farmer on Manitoulin Island. Bowman was a member of the Ontario Legislature from 1918 to 1926, and was Ontario Minister of Lands and Forests from 1919 to 1923.

Hilda Ranscombe (1913–1998) was born in Doon, and became a star ice hockey player on the Preston Rivulettes.

== Recent years ==
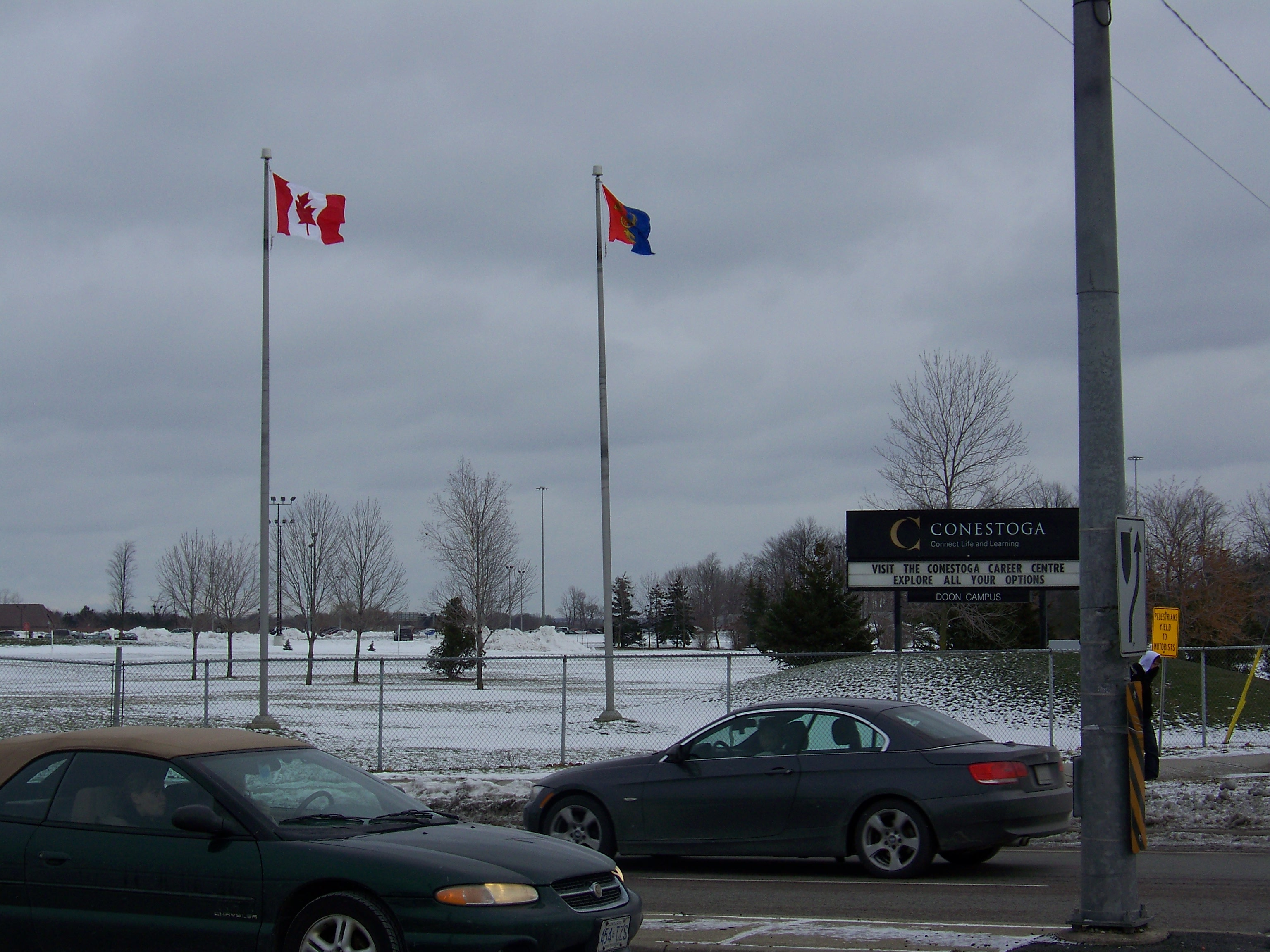
Conestoga College Doon campus from Homer Watson Blvd.

The population of Doon dropped sharply after the Doon Twines company relocated to Berlin, now Kitchener, during World War I. (Note: Many of the newcomers to the region were of German origin, often Mennonite. The area was named Berlin in 1833, and the village of Berlin was made the county seat of the county of Waterloo in 1856. During World War I, due to anti-German feelings, the city was renamed Kitchener, after the British general Herbert Kitchener, 1st Earl Kitchener.) There are now only a few small businesses in Doon, which has become a suburb for commuters to Kitchener and Cambridge.

After Phoebe Watson died the Watson house was home to the Doon School of Fine Arts from 1948 to 1966. The house, a substantial building in Scottish Gothic Vertical style that was built in 1834 by Adam Ferrie, was purchased by the City of Kitchener in 1981 and opened to the public as a historic building and art gallery. The Homer Watson Memorial Park lies next to the village.

Doon contains the Doon Heritage Village, which covers 60 acres (24 ha) and reconstructs a view of life in the region in 1914, on the eve of World War I. There are period buildings, farm animals and interpreters dressed in period clothes. The Waterloo Region Museum is at the entrance to the village. The former house of Peter McArthur was transported to the village from its original location on land owned by the McArthur family near Appin, Ontario in Ekfrid Township. Hugh C. Elliott (1899-1995), who had served in 1918–19 with the Canadian Engineers in Vladivostok, Siberia, was a charter director of the Doon Pioneer Village.

Conestoga College Institute of Technology and Advanced Learning is a polytechnic established in 1967. The original campus of Conestoga College, and the largest, is located in Doon by the Highway 401 / Homer Watson Blvd. interchange. The campus holds the college's main administrative offices. There are residences for full-time students next to the campus. A 3-storey 75,000 square feet (7,000 m^{2}) wing for the School of Health and Life Sciences opened in August 2011.

== See also ==
- List of unincorporated communities in Ontario
