= Alvin Edwin Graham =

Canadian politician from Ontario

Member of the Ontario Provincial Parliament for Manitoulin
- In office September 30, 1929 – April 3, 1934
- Preceded by: Thomas Farquhar
- Succeeded by: constituency abolished

Personal details
- Party: Conservative

Alvin Edwin Graham was a Canadian politician from the Conservative Party of Ontario. He represented Manitoulin in the Legislative Assembly of Ontario from 1929 to 1934.

== See also ==
- 18th Parliament of Ontario
