= Robert Roswell Gamey =

Canadian politician

Robert Roswell Gamey (August 29, 1865 – March 19, 1917) was an Ontario businessman and political figure. He represented Manitoulin in the Legislative Assembly of Ontario from 1902 to 1917 as a Conservative member.

He was born in Maxwell, Grey County, Canada West, the son of James Gamey, and educated there and in Collingwood. Gamey was a broker, insurance agent and speculated in mining. In 1885, he married Matilda Ferguson.

Following his election to the provincial assembly in 1902, Gamey declared his intent to support George William Ross's Liberals. However, in March 1903, he brought forward allegations that he had been offered money to change his political allegiance in the office of James Robert Stratton, the provincial secretary. Although the royal commission headed by John Alexander Boyd and William Glenholme Falconbridge that investigated these allegations later that year found no proof of corruption, the scandal weakened the Liberal government and the Conservatives under James Whitney won the election that followed in 1905. Gamey was censured but retained his seat, dying in office in 1917. He was buried on Manitoulin Island.
