= John Carruthers (politician) =

Canadian politician

Member of Parliament for Algoma East
- In office December 1921 – October 1925
- Preceded by: George Nicholson
- Succeeded by: George Nicholson

Personal details
- Born: 25 October 1863 Hamilton, Canada West
- Died: 25 December 1949 (aged 86)
- Party: Liberal
- Profession: physician

John Carruthers (25 October 1863 – 25 December 1949) was a Liberal party member of the House of Commons of Canada. He became a physician and mayor of Little Current, Ontario.

Carruthers was elected to Parliament at the Algoma East riding in the 1921 general election, defeating the Conservative incumbent George Nicholson. After serving one term in the 14th Canadian Parliament, Carruthers was defeated by Nicholson in the 1925 federal election.
