= Peter McArthur (writer) =

Farmer and writer in Ontario

Peter Gilchrist McArthur
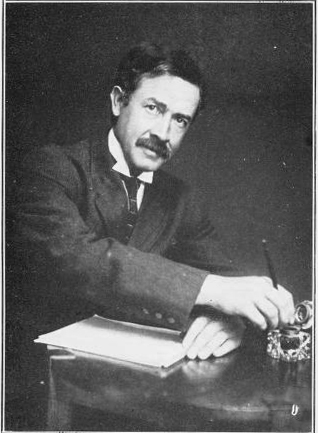
- Born: March 10, 1866; Ekfrid Township, Canada West
- Died: October 28, 1924 (aged 58); London, Ontario, Canada
- Education: University of Toronto
- Occupations: Writer, Poet, Farmer
- Writing career
- Notable works: The Prodigal Son, and Other Poems

Peter Gilchrist McArthur (March 10, 1866 – October 28, 1924) was a farmer and writer in Ontario.

== Biography ==
The son of Peter McArthur and Catherine McLennan, natives of Scotland, he was born in Ekfrid Township, Canada West and was educated at the collegiate and model school in Strathroy and at the University of Toronto. In 1895, McArthur married Mabel Clara Haywood-Waters. He left university in 1889 to become a reporter for the Toronto Daily Mail. The following year, McArthur moved to New York City. He was editor of Truth from 1895 to 1897 and also wrote articles, poems, and humour for various publications. In 1902, he moved to London, England, where he contributed to Punch, the Review of Reviews and The Daily Paper. In 1903, he published To be taken with salt: being an essay on teaching one’s grandmother to suck eggs. McArthur returned to New York in 1904, working as a partner in an advertising agency. In 1907, he published The prodigal, and other poems. He subsequently moved back to Ontario, settling in Ekfrid in 1908. There he worked a small farm and contributed to the Toronto Globe and the London Farmer's Advocate and Home Magazine. He published selected articles from those publications as In pastures green in 1915 and The red cow and her friends in 1919. From 1910 to 1912, he published eight issues of a journal called Ourselves: a Magazine for Cheerful Canadians.

He died in London, Ontario, at the age of 58 after undergoing surgery at the Victoria Hospital.

The McArthur family homestead was later moved to Doon Heritage Village in Kitchener.

== Works ==
- Five Sonnets, (1899)
- Lines, (1901)
- To Be Taken With Salt, (1903)
- The Ghost And The Burglar, (1905)
- The Peacemakers, (1905)
- The Prodigal, And Other Poems, (1907)
- In Pastures Green, (1915)
- The Red Cow And Her Friends, (1919)
- Sir Wilfrid Laurier, (1919)
- The Affable Stranger, (1920)
- The Last Law - Brotherhood, (1921)
- Stephen Leacock, (1923)
- Around Home, (1925)
- Familiar Fields, (1925)
- Friendly Acres, (1927)
- The Best Of Peter McArthur [edited by Alec Lucas], (1967)
