= Bud Wildman =

Canadian teacher and politician

The Honourable Bud Wildman ECO
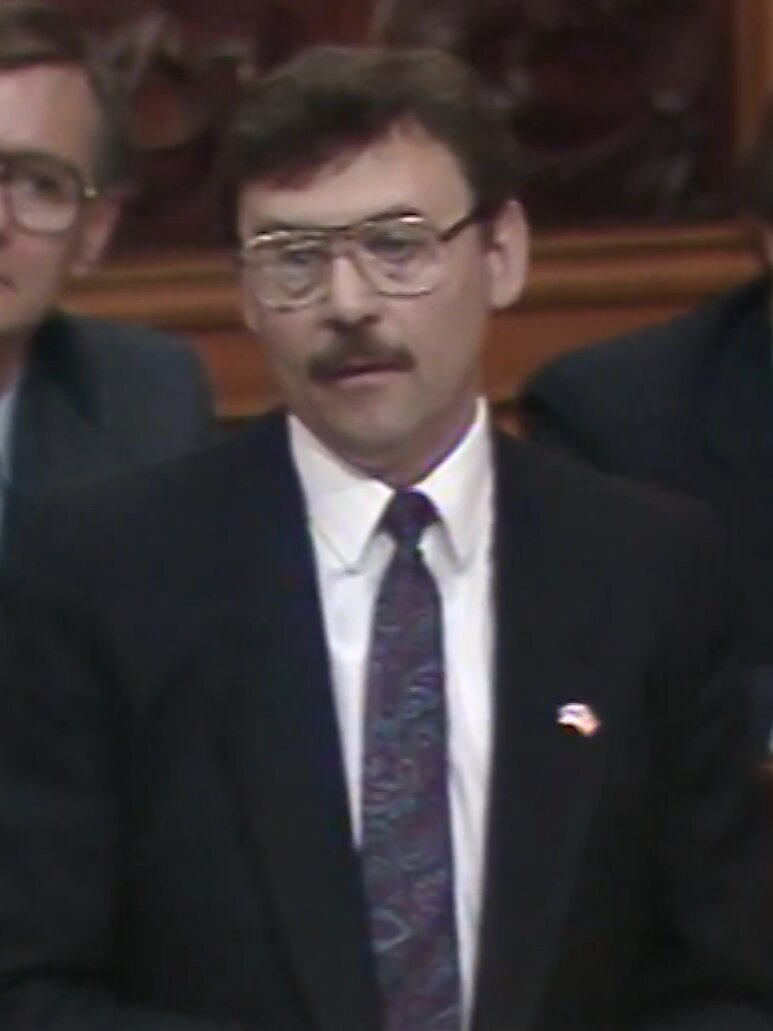
- Wildman in 1986

Parliamentary Leader of the Ontario New Democratic Party
- Interim
- In office February 10, 1996 – June 24, 1996
- Preceded by: Bob Rae
- Succeeded by: Howard Hampton

Ontario MPP
- In office 1975–1999
- Preceded by: Bernt Gilbertson
- Succeeded by: Riding abolished
- Constituency: Algoma

More...

Personal details
- Born: Charles Jackson Wildman; June 3, 1946 (age 79) Ottawa, Ontario, Canada
- Party: Ontario New Democratic Party
- Spouse: Anne Brophy
- Children: 5
- Occupation: High school teacher

Charles Jackson "Bud" Wildman (born June 3, 1946) is a Canadian politician. He served in the Legislative Assembly of Ontario as a New Democratic Party Member of Provincial Parliament (MPP) from 1975 to 1999, representing the riding of Algoma, and was a cabinet minister in the government of Bob Rae.

== Background ==
He was educated at Carleton University, the McArthur College of Education at Queen's University, and Algoma University. He lived in Echo Bay, Ontario after graduating, and worked as a high school history teacher. He and his wife raised four children. His son Jody Wildman is a municipal politician who, after first being elected as a councillor in 2000, has represented the Township of St. Joseph as mayor since 2003.

== Politics ==
Wildman was elected to the legislature in the provincial election of 1975, defeating incumbent Progressive Conservative Bernt Gilbertson by 398 votes. Wildman's victory was regarded by many as an upset; he received support from NDP bastions such as Wawa, but also from more traditionally Conservative areas on the north shore of Lake Huron.

He was re-elected by an increased margin over PC candidate Dave Liddle in the 1977 election, and retained his seat by significant margins in the elections of 1981, 1985, 1987, 1990 and 1995.

Wildman supported Jim Foulds's bid to lead the provincial NDP in 1982.

=== Government ===
The NDP won the 1990 provincial election, and Wildman was appointed to cabinet as Minister of Natural Resources and Minister responsible for Native Affairs on October 1, 1990. He was promoted to Minister of the Environment and Energy on February 3, 1993.

As Natural Resources minister, Wildman initiated the first public audit of Ontario's forest resources and promoted an ecosystem management approach for forest harvesting. Ontario's Environmental Bill of Rights was also approved during his tenure as Minister of Environment and Energy.

As Minister responsible for Native Affairs during the entire tenure of the Rae government, Wildman instituted a regime of dealing with First Nations on a government to government basis, signing a "Statement of Political Relationship" with Ontario First Nation Chiefs, and concluded a number of land claims settlements. He also established the Aboriginal Healing and Wellness Strategy, which sought to address health problems among native peoples in a culturally sensitive manner.

In January 1991, Wildman issued an order permitting members of Golden Lake First Nation to hunt and fish in Algonquin Park pending settlement of the band's claim of the Ottawa Valley which included the park. However a broad coalition of park users protested the order and formed a group called the Adhoc Committee to Save Algonquin Park. The committee was eventually dissolved once the claim was settled which restricted hunting in the park.

=== Cabinet positions ===
Rae ministry, Province of Ontario (1990–1995)
Cabinet posts (2)
Predecessor	Office	Successor
Ruth Grier (Environment), Brian Charlton (Energy)	Minister of Environment and Energy; 1993–1995	Brenda Elliott
Lyn McLeod	Minister of Natural Resources; 1990–1993; Also Responsible for Native Affairs	Howard Hampton

=== Return to opposition ===
The NDP were defeated in the 1995 general election and reduced to third-party status, although Wildman retained the Algoma riding by a reduced margin. Rae resigned as leader the next year and Wildman served as interim leader in the legislature from February 10, 1996 until June 24, 1996 when Howard Hampton took over the position after his victory in that year's Ontario NDP leadership convention. Wildman had been approached by the NDP's northern Ontario MPPs about running for the leadership of the party but declined.

The Algoma riding was radically redistributed in 1996, merging with the neighbouring riding of Algoma—Manitoulin and incorporating other territory from surrounding ridings as well. Wildman decided not to run in the 1999 election, and retired from provincial politics after almost a quarter century at Queen's Park.

=== Federal politics ===
Wildman attempted to win a seat in the federal House of Commons in the 2000 federal election, running in Sault Ste. Marie for the New Democratic Party. The NDP actively targeted this seat as winnable, and party leader Alexa McDonough visited the riding very late in the campaign. Wildman was however unsuccessful, finishing second against Liberal incumbent Carmen Provenzano.

== Later life ==
Since leaving politics Wildman has worked as a consultant. He served as the Chair of the Board of Governors of Algoma University. Wildman was also a member of the board of directors of the Sault Ste. Marie and District Group Health Centre. In 2021, Wildman was awarded an honorary Doctorate of Letters by Algoma University, in recognition of his 24 years—seven terms—of service as MPP for Algoma and in the government of Ontario, as Minister of Natural Resources, Minister responsible for Native Affairs and Minister of Environment and Energy between 1990 and 1995, as well as his community volunteerism subsequent to his retirement from electoral politics, serving as Chair of the Algoma University Board of Governors and as Chair of the Sault Group Health Association Board of Directors.
