= Henry Horricks =

- Born: May 4, 1883 near Thessalon, Ontario, Canada
- Died: November 17, 1968 (aged 85); Calgary, Canada
- Education: B.A., University of Toronto; B.D., Victoria University, Toronto, 1913
- Occupations: minister, Methodist Church (later United Church of Canada), 1913-58; founder and president, Alberta School of Religion, 1924-58

Henry Magee Horricks (4 May 1883 – 17 November 1968) was a Canadian minister, pacifist, and anti-racism activist. In the 1935 Canadian federal election, Horricks also ran as the Co-operative Commonwealth Federation candidate in Calgary West.

In 1924 Reverend Horricks founded the Alberta School of Religion, which "provided the core support for an interwar peace movement before the organization of a Canadian branch of the Fellowship of Reconciliation on a national basis". Initially affiliated with the United Church of Canada, in 1935 it affiliated with the Fellowship for a Christian Social Order led by Kirby Page and Sherwood Eddy, and during World War II it affiliated with the Fellowship of Reconciliation.

Henry Horricks attracted an impressive roster of lecturers to the school, including Bishop Paul Jones, H. Richard Niebuhr, A.J. Muste, Harry F. Ward, Sherwood Eddy, Elmore Philpott, Paul Arthur Schilpp, Scott Nearing, Jerome Davis, and many others. Controversially, one of the summer sessions was attended by J.S. Woodsworth.

"Under Horricks' leadership the Alberta School sought to assist in breaking down the barriers of nationalism and race prejudice separating peoples of different countries. Among the subjects explored at the school were the armaments race and its probable outcome, the viewpoints of labor, farmers, and the dispossessed classes, and the relationship between the social system and human values." Those who joined the "Horricks Fellowship" took a pacifist pledge declaring:

"I will endeavor as far as my influence goes to discourage the use of violence as a method of settling disputes among nations but will rely on love and good will as the most powerful force in all life."
