= Bernt Gilbertson =

Canadian politician (1912–1995)

Ontario MPP
- In office 1967–1975
- Preceded by: Riding re-established
- Succeeded by: Bud Wildman
- Constituency: Algoma

Personal details
- Born: March 17, 1912 Mo i Rana, Nordland, Norway
- Died: June 21, 1995 (aged 83) St. Joseph Island, Ontario
- Party: Progressive Conservative
- Occupation: Businessman

Bernt Nicole Gilbertson (March 17, 1912 – June 21, 1995) was a Canadian politician, who represented the electoral district of Algoma in the Legislative Assembly of Ontario from 1967 to 1975. He was a member of the Progressive Conservatives.

Born in Norway, Gilbertson's family emigrated to Canada and settled on St. Joseph Island in Ontario's Algoma District. He began his working career on the freighters plying the Great Lakes, and later ran a maple syrup business before his election to the legislature, and was known for bringing cans of syrup to the legislature as gifts for his fellow MPPs each spring. He also owned a trucking business and a pancake house. In his riding, he was particularly known for his efforts to have the bridge on Highway 548 built to connect St. Joseph Island to the mainland. The bridge was named in his honour in 1994.

In the Legislative Assembly, Gilbertson served as caucus chair and chief government whip, in addition to serving on a variety of standing committees.

Gilbertson died in summer 1995 on St. Joseph Island. On October 5, in one of the first sessions of the legislature following the 1995 provincial election, tributes to Gilbertson were delivered in the Assembly by Bud Wildman, Norm Sterling and Mike Brown.

Gilbertson's family business, Gilbertson's Maple Syrup Products, is still in operation as the largest producer of maple syrup in Ontario. It is now owned by Gilbertson's son Don.
