= Charles Farwell =

Charles Farwell may refer to:

- Charles B. Farwell (1823–1903), U.S. Representative and Senator from Illinois
- Charles Franklin Farwell (1860–?), Ontario lawyer and political figure
