= Thessalon =

- Town (single-tier)
- Town of Thessalon
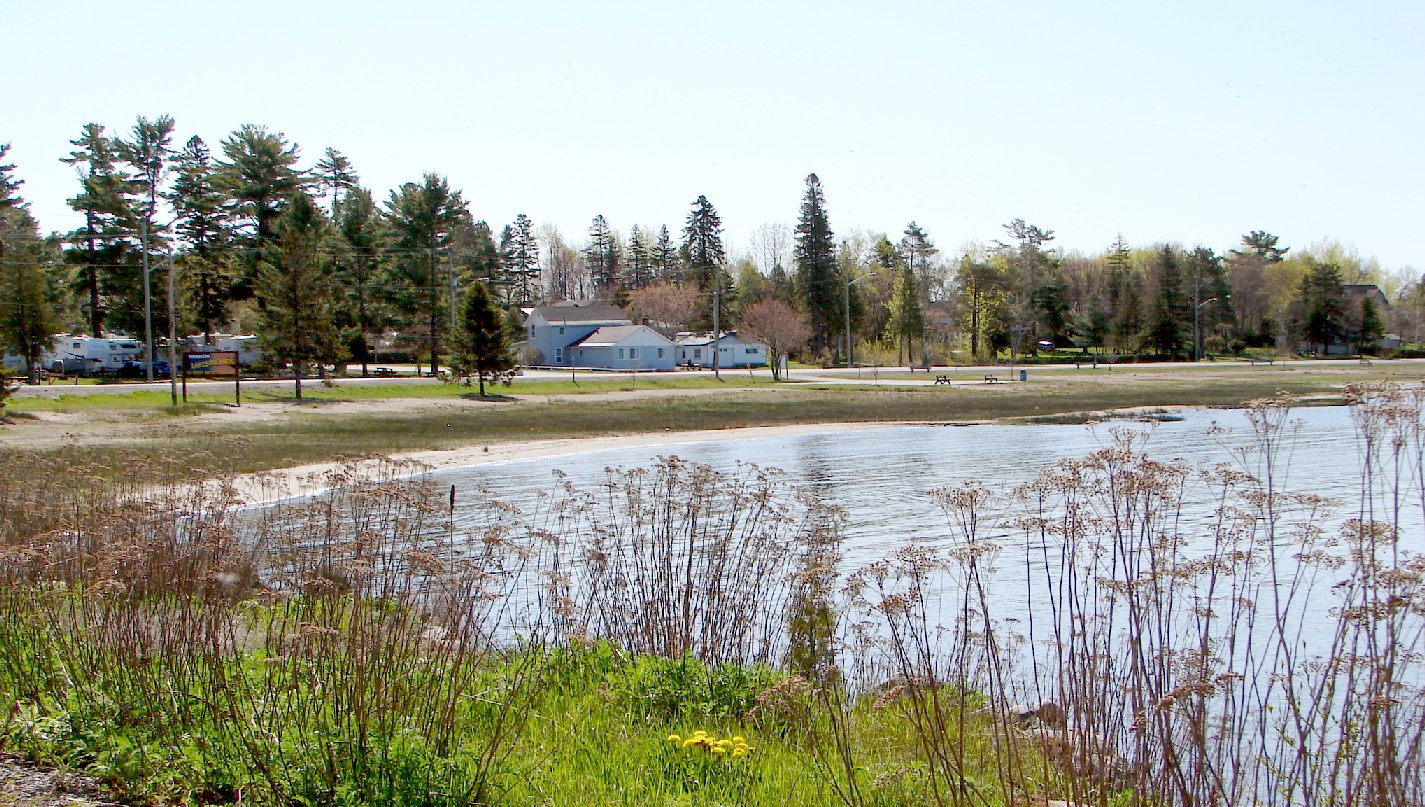
- Thessalon waterfront

- Location within Ontario Location within Canada
- Coordinates: 46°15′23″N 83°33′26″W
- Country: Canada
- Province: Ontario
- District: Algoma

Government
  - Type: Town
  - Mayor: Jordan Bird
  - MP: Terry Sheehan (Liberal)
  - MPP: Bill Rosenberg (PC)

Area
  - Land: 4.38 km^{2} (1.69 sq mi)

Population (2021)
  - Total: 1,260
  - Density: 287.5/km^{2} (745/sq mi)
- Time zone: UTC−05:00 (EST)
  - Summer (DST): UTC−04:00 (EDT)
- Postal code: P0R 1L0
- Area code(s): 705
- Website: www.thessalon.ca

Thessalon is a town in the Canadian province of Ontario, located at the junction of Highway 17 and Highway 129 on the north shore of Lake Huron. It is surrounded by, but not part of, the municipality of Huron Shores, and is part of Algoma District. The main industries are timber and tourism. The town is a popular retirement community. It is the administrative headquarters of the Thessalon First Nation, Algoma Mutual Insurance, and the Algoma District Services Administration Board as District Seat.

== History ==
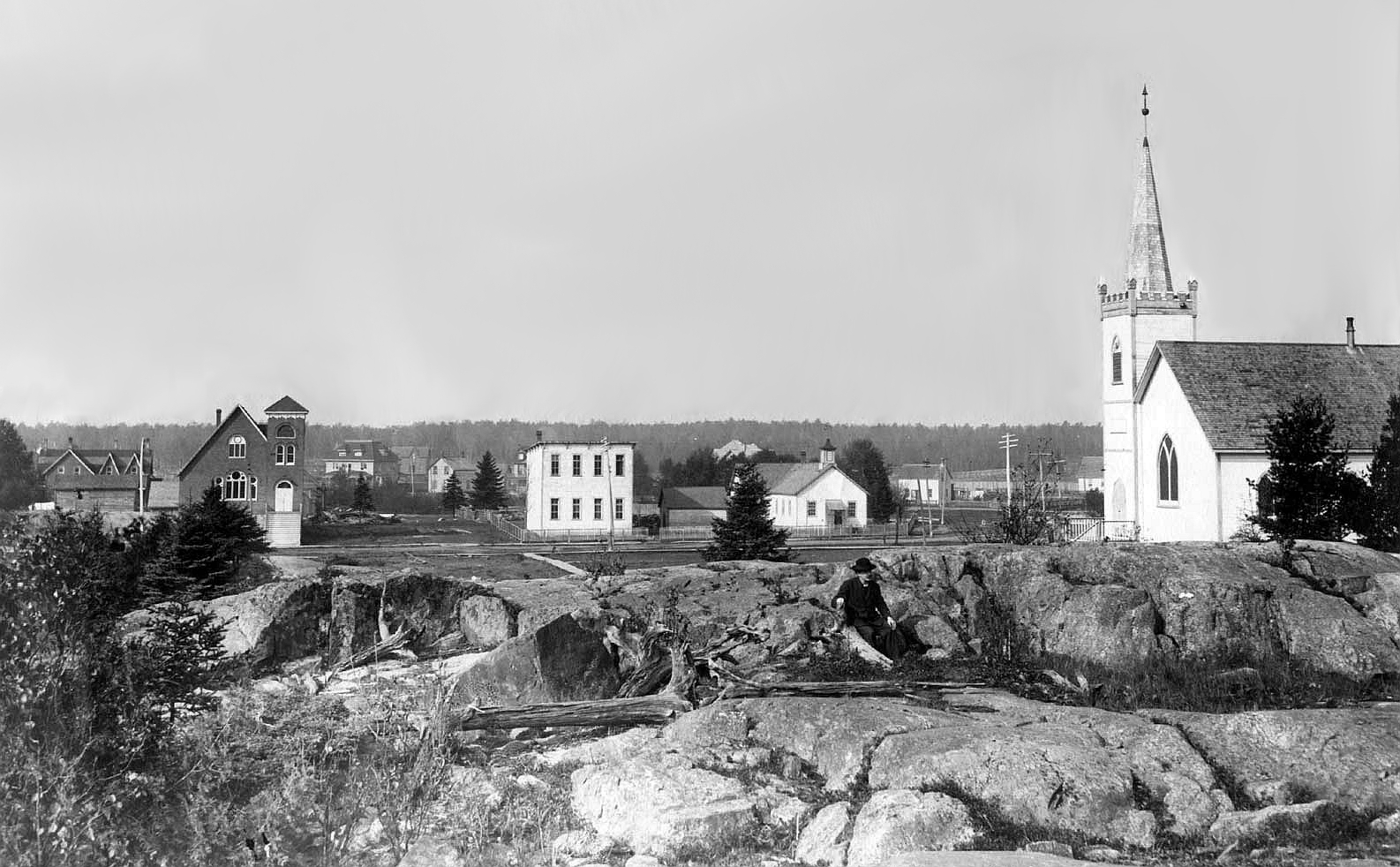
Circa 1905

The region was first surveyed by Europeans in 1869 to determine if the area could support a viable lumber industry. By the winter of 1870 the beginnings of a lumber camp had taken root and in 1877 a more permanent settlement was established. Thessalon was incorporated in 1892 with Walter Barrett serving as mayor. Nathaniel Dyment of Barrie, the owner of Dyment Co., one of the earliest and most prominent lumber companies in the area, is considered the founding figure of Thessalon. He named his 1903 King's Plate-winning thoroughbred horse after the town.

The exact origin of the town's name is unclear. Area historian J.E. MacDonald reported that "Thessalon" is a corruption of a name given by local First Nations, Neyashewun, meaning "a point of land". It is also theorized that the town may have been named by Jesuit missionaries who compared their travels through the region to the plight of the Thessalonians described in the Pauline epistles. The town was spelt "Tessalon" on some early maps.

== Demographics ==
In the 2021 Census of Population conducted by Statistics Canada, Thessalon had a population of 1,260 living in 559 of its 600 total private dwellings, a change of −2% from its 2016 population of 1,286. With a land area of 4.38 km^{2} (1.69 sq mi), it had a population density of 287.7/km^{2} (745.1/sq mi) in 2021.

Canada census – Thessalon community profile

	2021	2016	2011
Population	1,260 (-2.0% from 2016)	1,286 (+0.5% from 2011)	1,279 (-2.5% from 2006)
Land area	4.38 km^{2} (1.69 sq mi)	4.52 km^{2} (1.75 sq mi)	4.37 km^{2} (1.69 sq mi)
Population density	287.5/km^{2} (745/sq mi)	284.6/km^{2} (737/sq mi)	292.4/km^{2} (757/sq mi)
Median age	58.8 (M: 56.8, F: 60.4)	55.8 (M: 54.5, F: 56.7)
Private dwellings	600 (total) 559 (occupied)	624 (total)	594 (total)
Median household income	$58,400	$53,760

References: 2021 2016 2011

Historical census populations – Thessalon

Year	Pop.	±%
1901	1,205	—
1911	1,945	+61.4%
1921	1,651	−15.1%
1931	1,632	−1.2%
1941	1,316	−19.4%
1951	1,595	+21.2%
1956	1,716	+7.6%

Year	Pop.	±%
1961	1,725	+0.5%
1966	1,688	−2.1%
1971	1,879	+11.3%
1976	1,824	−2.9%
1981	1,620	−11.2%
1986	1,522	−6.0%
1991	1,543	+1.4%

Year	Pop.	±%
1996	1,485	−3.8%
2001	1,386	−6.7%
2006	1,312	−5.3%
2011	1,279	−2.5%
2016	1,286	+0.5%
2021	1,260	−2.0%

Source: Statistics Canada

== Amenities and recreation ==
There is an arena, a curling club and one primary school in the town. The town was also home to the Thessalon Flyers. The Voyageur Hiking Trail passes near the community.

The Thessalon River flows through the town and into Lake Huron at Water Street. Fishing is excellent in the river: yellow perch, pickerel, bass, northwater salmon and muskie. Sault College offers the only satellite post-secondary programming in Algoma District, in Thessalon. The Algoma Manor is the District’s largest long-term care home.

== Transportation ==
Ontario Northland provides intercity motor coach service to Thessalon as a stop along its Sault Ste. Marie–Sudbury–North Bay–Ottawa route, with one bus a day each headed eastbound and westbound from Sunday to Friday, with no service on Saturdays.

Thessalon station was once a divisional point along the Canadian Pacific Railway's Sudbury–Soo Line. Passenger service began in the area around 1905, and a station building was constructed around 1910. With dwindling passenger traffic along the line, service was gradually discontinued, and the station was demolished sometime after 1971.

== Notable people ==
- John Fullerton, politician
- Henry Horricks, minister, pacifist, (born near Thessalon)
- Jack Markle, hockey player
- Wilfred Lynn Miller, politician
- Shilo Rousseau, Olympic biathlete
