= Kenneth Spencer Stover =

Canadian politician from Ontario

Member of the Ontario Provincial Parliament for Algoma
- In office October 20, 1919 – May 10, 1923
- Preceded by: John Morrow Robb
- Succeeded by: Arthur Gladstone Wallis

Personal details
- Party: Liberal

Kenneth Spencer Stover was a Canadian politician from Ontario. He represented Algoma in the Legislative Assembly of Ontario from 1919 to 1923.

== See also ==
- 15th Parliament of Ontario
