= Alexander Franklin Campbell =

Journalist, politician

Ontario MPP
- In office 1890–1894
- Preceded by: Robert Adam Lyon
- Succeeded by: Charles Franklin Farwell
- Constituency: Algoma East

Personal details
- Born: March 16, 1845 Peel County, Canada West
- Died: December 18, 1923 (aged 78)
- Party: Conservative
- Spouses: Elizabeth Baldock (m. 1870) Josephine Aitken (m. 1876)
- Children: 1
- Occupation: Journalist

Alexander Franklin Campbell (March 16, 1845 – December 18, 1923) was a journalist and political figure in Ontario, Canada. He represented Algoma East in the Legislative Assembly of Ontario as a Conservative member from 1890 to 1894.

He was born in Mayfield, Chinguacousy Township, Peel County, Canada West and educated there and in Brampton. In 1870, Campbell married Elizabeth Baldock; he married Josephine Aitken in 1876 after the death of his first wife. He was editor and publisher of the Brampton Conservator from 1873 to 1890. Campbell was mayor of Brampton in 1887 and 1888 and president of the county Agriculture and Arts Association. He also served as chairman of the school board. Campbell was a county master for the Orange Lodge and served in the local militia during the Fenian raids. He ran unsuccessfully in Peel for a seat in the provincial assembly in 1886.

== As member for Algoma East ==
During his time as an MPP, he was a Member for the Standing Committees on Railways, on Printing, and on Standing Orders.
