= Michael A. Brown (Canadian politician) =

Canadian politician (1950–2024)

Mike Brown

Ontario MPP
- In office 1987–2011
- Preceded by: John Gordon Lane
- Succeeded by: Michael Mantha
- Constituency: Algoma—Manitoulin

39th Speaker of the Legislative Assembly of Ontario
- In office October 11, 2005 – November 28, 2007
- Preceded by: Alvin Curling
- Succeeded by: Steve Peters

Personal details
- Born: April 18, 1950 Sarnia, Ontario, Canada
- Died: September 20, 2024 (aged 74)
- Party: Liberal
- Occupation: Funeral director

Michael Arthur Brown (April 18, 1950 – September 20, 2024) was a Canadian politician in Ontario who was the Speaker of the Legislative Assembly of Ontario from October 2005 until October 2007. He sat in the Ontario legislature representing the northern riding of Algoma—Manitoulin for the Ontario Liberal Party from 1987 to 2011.

== Background ==
Brown was born in Sarnia, Ontario on April 18, 1950. He was educated at the University of Western Ontario and Humber College, and worked as a funeral director before entering public life. He was a member of the Manitoulin Planning Board, and was president of the Manitoulin Island Country Club.

Brown died on September 20, 2024, at the age of 74.

== Politics ==
Brown was elected to the Ontario legislature in the provincial election of 1987, defeating New Democrat Ron Boucher and Progressive Conservative Ben Wilson. The Algoma—Manitoulin riding had been held by the Progressive Conservatives for several years, and Brown's victory was part of a larger trend towards the Liberal Party in northern Ontario.

The Liberals were defeated by the NDP in the provincial election of 1990. Most ridings in northern Ontario were won by the NDP, and Brown was only able to defeat NDP candidate Lois Miller by 207 votes. He was re-elected by a larger margin in the provincial election of 1995, which was won by the Progressive Conservatives. In 1996, he endorsed Dwight Duncan's bid to lead the Ontario Liberal Party.

In 1996, the Tory government of Mike Harris introduced a measure to reduce the number of ridings in the province from 130 to 103. Brown's constituency of Algoma—Manitoulin was joined with the neighbouring constituency of Algoma to create a much larger riding bearing the Algoma—Manitoulin name. He faced New Democrat Lynn Watson and Progressive Conservative Keith Currie in the election of 1999. Although Currie actually received a plurality of votes in the old Algoma riding, Brown's dominance over the eastern corner of the constituency was such that he was able to win re-election without difficulty. The Tories again won the election; Brown served as Deputy Speaker from 2000 to 2001.

The Liberals won a majority government in the provincial election of 2003, although Brown was actually re-elected with a reduced majority over New Democrat Peter Denley. On October 23, 2003, he was named parliamentary assistant to David Ramsay, the Ontario Minister of Natural Resources. He was elected speaker of the 38th Legislative Assembly of Ontario on October 11, 2005, defeating Tory Ted Arnott in a two-way contest. The vacancy in the position was caused when Alvin Curling was named ambassador to the Dominican Republic.

Brown stood for re-election as Speaker when the 39th Legislative Assembly first convened following the 2007 provincial election but he was defeated by fellow Liberal Steve Peters on the fourth ballot. Brown's loss was attributed to the perception that he favoured the ruling party when meting discipline to unruly politicians.

In the 2011 provincial election he lost to NDP candidate Michael Mantha by nearly 4,000 votes.

== Electoral record ==
2011 Ontario general election
Party	Candidate	Votes	%	±%
New Democratic	Michael Mantha	11,560	44.45	+7.50
Liberal	Michael A. Brown	7,405	28.47	-14.09
Progressive Conservative	Joe Chapman	6,147	23.64	+9.62
Green	Jason Tilson	677	2.60	-2.55
Family Coalition	David Hoffman	218	0.84	-0.49
Total valid votes		26,007	100.0	

2007 Ontario general election
Party	Candidate	Votes	%	±%
Liberal	Mike Brown	11,455	42.8	-6.8
New Democratic	Peter Denley	9,853	36.8	5.1
Progressive Conservative	Ron Swain	3,740	14.0	-3.3
Green	Ron Yurick	1,369	5.1	2.8
Family Coalition	Ray Scott	361	1.4	

2003 Ontario general election
Party	Candidate	Votes	%	+/-
Liberal	Michael A. Brown	14,520	49.6	+5.1
New Democratic	Peter Denley	9,459	31.7	+4.4
Progressive Conservative	Terry McCutcheon	5,168	17.3	-9.5
Green	Ron Yurick	680	2.3	-

1999 Ontario general election
Party	Candidate	Votes	%	+/-
Liberal	Michael A. Brown	14,299	44.5	+1.4
New Democratic	Lynn Watson	8,780	27.3	+6.5
Progressive Conservative	Keith Currie	8,617	26.8	-9.3
Libertarian	Graham Hearn	425	1.3	-

1995 Ontario general election
Party	Candidate	Votes	%	+/-
Liberal	Michael A. Brown	6,190	43.1	+4.2
Progressive Conservative	Joyce Foster	5,184	36.1	+22.0
New Democratic	Lois Miller	2,991	20.8	-16.7

1990 Ontario general election
Party	Candidate	Votes	%	+/-
Liberal	Michael A. Brown	5,961	38.9	-7.2
New Democratic	Lois Miller	5,754	37.5	+9.3
Progressive Conservative	Ken Ferguson	2,163	14.1	-11.6
Confederation of Regions	Richard Hammond	1,114	7.3	-
Independents	Gene Solomon	347	2.3	-

1987 Ontario general election
Party	Candidate	Votes	%	+/-
Liberal	Michael A. Brown	7,157	46.1	+15.1
New Democratic	Ron Boucher	4,385	28.2	+6.4
Progressive Conservative	Ben Wilson	3,999	25.7	-21.5
