= Stan Farquhar =

Canadian politician

Ontario MPP
- In office 1963–1971
- Preceded by: John Fullerton
- Succeeded by: John Lane
- Constituency: Algoma—Manitoulin

Personal details
- Born: February 24, 1916 Sault Ste. Marie, Ontario
- Died: May 30, 1992 (aged 76) Vancouver Island, British Columbia
- Party: Liberal
- Spouse: Catherine May Reid
- Occupation: Manager

Stanley William Farquhar (February 24, 1916 – May 30, 1992) was a politician in Ontario, Canada. He was a Liberal member of the Legislative Assembly of Ontario from 1963 to 1971 who represented the riding of Algoma—Manitoulin.

== Background ==
He was born in Sault Ste. Marie, Ontario, the son of Thomas Farquhar. In 1949, he married Catherine May Reid. He was general manager of Thomas Farquhar and Sons, which produced dairy products and ice cream. Farquhar died at his home on Vancouver Island in 1992.

== Politics ==
Farquhar served on the local school board and was mayor of Little Current.

In 1963, Farquhar ran as the Liberal candidate in the northern Ontario riding of Algoma—Manitoulin. He defeated Progressive Conservative incumbent John Fullerton by 1,522 votes. In 1967 he was re-elected by 1,402 votes. He retired from politics in 1971.
