= Simon James Dawson =

Canadian politician

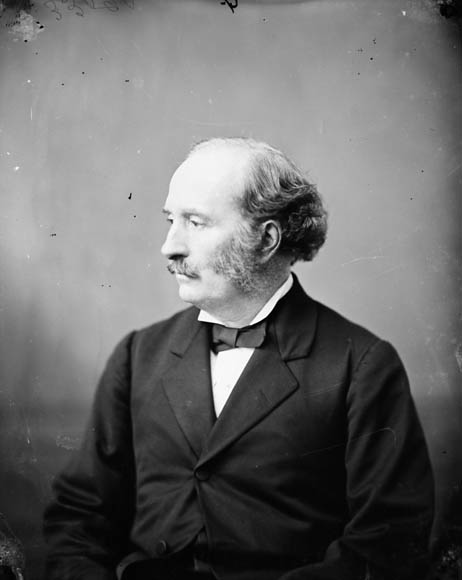

Member of Parliament for Algoma
- In office 1878–1891
- Preceded by: Edward Borron
- Succeeded by: George Hugh Macdonell

Ontario MPP
- In office 1875–1878
- Preceded by: Frederick William Cumberland
- Succeeded by: Robert Adam Lyon
- Constituency: Algoma

Personal details
- Born: June 13, 1818 Redhaven, Banffshire, Scotland
- Died: October 30, 1902 (aged 84) Ottawa, Ontario
- Party: Liberal
- Occupation: Engineer

Simon James Dawson (June 13, 1818 – October 30, 1902) was a Canadian civil engineer and politician.

== Career ==
Born in Redhaven, Banffshire, Scotland, Dawson emigrated to Canada as a young man and began his career as an engineer. In 1857, as a member of a Canadian government expedition, he surveyed a line of road from Prince Arthur’s Landing (later Port Arthur, now part of Thunder Bay, Ontario) to Fort Garry and further explored that area in 1858 and 1859. His report greatly stimulated Canadian interest in the West. In 1868, he was placed in charge of construction of a wagon and water route following his earlier survey by the newly formed federal Department of Public Works. The Dawson road was traversed in 1870 by the Wolseley Expedition under the command of Colonel Garnet Wolseley sent to preserve order during the first Riel uprising, the Red River Rebellion.

Dawson represented Algoma in the Legislative Assembly of Ontario from 1875 to 1878 and Algoma in the House of Commons of Canada from 1878 to 1891. As a politician, he was a consistent advocate for native rights. In 1875, he proposed that the riding of Algoma, then the only riding in the region of northern Ontario, become a separate territory, until it had enough population for provincial status. As a Scottish Roman Catholic, he was an anomaly in Protestant Ontario where most Scots were Presbyterian.

His brother William McDonell Dawson served as Crown Lands agent at Ottawa and was superintendent of the woods and forests branch in the Crown Lands department from 1852 to 1857. In 1858, he was elected to the Legislative Assembly of the Province of Canada for Trois-Rivières; he was defeated there but elected for the County of Ottawa in the 1861 general election. Another brother was the Roman Catholic priest Aeneas McDonell Dawson.

He died in Ottawa in 1902, virtually forgotten.

== Electoral history ==
1887 Canadian federal election: Algoma
Party	Candidate	Votes	%
Conservative	Simon James Dawson	1,428	50.32
Unknown	Daniel F. Burk	1,410	49.68

1882 Canadian federal election: Algoma
Party	Candidate	Votes	%
Conservative	Simon James Dawson	1,707	60.55
Liberal	William McDougall	1,112	39.45

1878 Canadian federal election: Algoma
Party	Candidate	Votes	%
Conservative	Simon James Dawson	885	64.84
Unknown	Mr. Rankin	480	35.16
Source: Canadian Elections Database

1875 Ontario general election: Algoma
Party	Candidate	Votes	%
Liberal	Simon James Dawson	510	64.31
Conservative	E. Biggins	283	35.69
Turnout		793	91.25
Eligible voters		869	
Liberal gain from Conservative			
Source: Elections Ontario
