= Michael Mantha =

Canadian politician

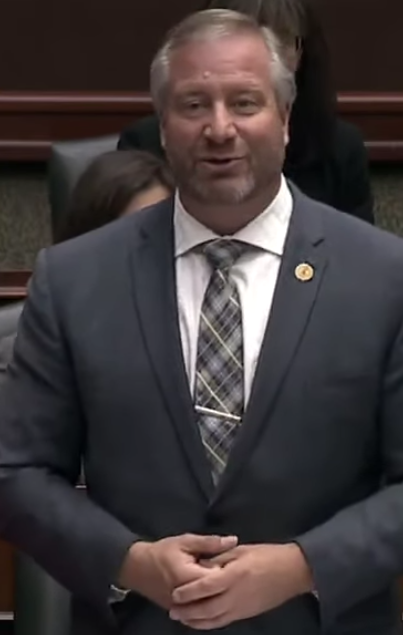
- Mantha in 2019

Member of the Ontario Provincial Parliament for Algoma—Manitoulin
- In office October 6, 2011 – January 28, 2025
- Preceded by: Mike Brown
- Succeeded by: Bill Rosenberg

Personal details
- Party: Independent (2023–present)
- Other political affiliations: New Democratic (2011–2023)
- Spouse: Pauline
- Children: 2
- Occupation: Administrative assistant

Michael E. Mantha is a politician in Ontario, Canada. He was elected as New Democratic member of the Legislative Assembly of Ontario until his removal from the Ontario NDP caucus on March 31, 2023, after which he sat as an independent. He was first elected in 2011. He represented the riding of Algoma—Manitoulin until his defeat in the 2025 Ontario general election.

== Background ==
Prior to his election, Mantha was a staffer in the riding office of Carol Hughes, the federal Member of Parliament for Algoma—Manitoulin—Kapuskasing. He lives in Elliot Lake, Ontario with his wife Pauline and their two sons.

== Politics ==
Mantha ran in the 2011 provincial election as the New Democratic candidate in the riding of Algoma—Manitoulin. He defeated Liberal incumbent Mike Brown by 4,188 votes. He was re-elected in the 2014 provincial election defeating Liberal candidate Craig Hughson by 7,668 votes. Mantha was re-elected in the 2022 Ontario general election.

He served the party's critic for a number of portfolios, including Northern Development and Mines, Indigenous Relations and Reconciliation and Northern Development and Tourism.

Mantha introduced several pieces of legislation, including a motion that was unanimously passed to create a lyme disease strategy in Ontario.

On April 1, 2023, Ontario NDP leader Marit Stiles removed Mantha from the caucus pending the results of an investigation into alleged misconduct involving a staffer. The decision was made after Stiles received an interim report on the allegations.

On August 15, 2023, Mantha was permanently removed from the NDP caucus after a third-party investigation found that the allegations of workplace misconduct levied against him were substantiated.

He stood for re-election as an independent but was defeated.

== Electoral record ==
2025 Ontario general election: Algoma—Manitoulin
Party	Candidate	Votes	%	±%	Expenditures
Progressive Conservative	Bill Rosenberg	11,263	41.33	+5.85	$69,335
New Democratic	David Timeriski	7,409	27.19	–18.74	$38,229
Liberal	Reg Niganobe	3,948	14.49	+5.78	$10,822
Independent	Michael Mantha	3,238	11.88	–34.05	$22,791
New Blue	Sheldon Pressey	718	2.63	–2.68	$224
Green	Maria Legault	677	2.48	–0.63	$40
Total valid votes/expense limit		27,253	99.08	–	$102,206
Total rejected, unmarked and declined ballots		253	0.92	+0.25	
Turnout		27,506	48.93	+6.46	
Eligible voters		56,213			
Progressive Conservative gain from New Democratic		Swing		+12.30	
Source: Elections Ontario

2022 Ontario general election: Algoma—Manitoulin
Party	Candidate	Votes	%	±%	Expenditures
New Democratic	Michael Mantha	11,252	45.93	–12.63	$56,480
Progressive Conservative	Cheryl Fort	8,692	35.48	+11.03	$39,185
Liberal	Tim Vine	2,133	8.71	+0.61	$28,774
New Blue	Ron Koski	1,302	5.31	–	$1,144
Green	Maria Legault	764	3.12	–0.39	$381
Ontario Party	Frederick Weening	356	1.45	–	$0
Total valid votes/expense limit		24,499	99.34	+0.26	$91,463
Total rejected, unmarked and declined ballots		164	0.67	–0.25	
Turnout		24,663	42.47	–10.61	
Eligible voters		58,076			
New Democratic hold		Swing		▼11.83	
Source: Elections Ontario

2018 Ontario general election: Algoma—Manitoulin
Party	Candidate	Votes	%	±%	Expenditures
New Democratic	Michael Mantha	17,105	58.56	+5.15	$71,665
Progressive Conservative	Jib Turner	7,143	24.45	+7.16	$32,275
Liberal	Charles Fox	2,365	8.10	–16.42	$28,755
Northern Ontario Heritage	Tommy Lee	1,366	4.68	–	$0
Green	Justin Tilson	1,025	3.51	+0.39	$208
Libertarian	Kalena Mallon-Ferguson	207	0.71	–0.95	none listed
Total valid votes		29,211	99.08		
Total rejected, unmarked and declined ballots		270	0.92	–0.30	
Turnout		29,481	53.08	+3.70	
Eligible voters		55,544			
New Democratic hold		Swing		–1.22	
Source: Elections Ontario

2014 Ontario general election: Algoma—Manitoulin
Party	Candidate	Votes	%	±%
New Democratic	Michael Mantha	14,171	53.41	+8.89
Liberal	Craig Hughson	6,504	24.51	–3.91
Progressive Conservative	Jib Turner	4,589	17.30	–6.30
Green	Alexandra Zalucky	828	3.12	+0.49
Libertarian	Richard Hadidian	441	1.66	–
Total valid votes		26,533	98.78	
Total rejected, unmarked and declined ballots		327	1.22	+0.71
Turnout		26,860	49.38	–0.05
Eligible voters		54,395		
New Democratic hold		Swing		+6.40
Source: Elections Ontario

2011 Ontario general election
Party	Candidate	Votes	%	±%
New Democratic	Michael Mantha	11,585	44.52	+7.57
Liberal	Michael A. Brown	7,397	28.42	−14.14
Progressive Conservative	Joe Chapman	6,141	23.60	+9.58
Green	Jason Tilson	684	2.63	−2.52
Family Coalition	David Hoffman	217	0.83	-0.50
Total valid votes		26,024	100.0	
Total rejected, unmarked and declined ballots		134	0.51	
Turnout		26,158	49.43	
Eligible voters		52,919		
New Democratic gain from Liberal		Swing		+10.86
Source: Elections Ontario
