= Robert Adam Lyon =

Canadian businessman and politician

Ontario MPP
- In office 1885–1890
- Preceded by: New riding
- Succeeded by: Alexander Franklin Campbell
- Constituency: Algoma East

Ontario MPP
- In office 1878–1884
- Preceded by: Simon James Dawson
- Succeeded by: Riding abolished
- Constituency: Algoma

Personal details
- Born: October 4, 1829 Glasgow, Scotland
- Died: June 6, 1901 (aged 71) Sault Ste. Marie, Ontario
- Party: Liberal
- Occupation: Businessman

Robert Adam Lyon (baptized 4 October 1829 – June 6, 1901) was a Canadian businessman and Liberal member of the Ontario Provincial Parliament from 1878 to 1884 and from 1885 to 1890.

He was born in Glasgow, Scotland in 1829 and came to Halton County, Ontario in Upper Canada with his parents in 1832. With his brother William Durie Lyon, he opened a general store in Milton. In 1866, he became involved in the development of timber on Manitoulin Island. He established a settlement at Michael's Bay on the island.

In 1878, he became the MLA for Algoma in a by-election, replacing Simon James Dawson. He was re-elected in 1879 and 1883, but resigned in 1884 over allegations of irregularities during the election. In 1885, he was elected in the new riding of Algoma East. In 1888, his business went into bankruptcy and he was defeated in the election of 1890. He died in Sault Ste. Marie, Ontario in 1901.

== Electoral history ==
Ontario provincial by-election, September 1878: Algoma Resignation of Simon James Dawson
Party	Candidate	Votes
Liberal	Robert Adam Lyon	Acclaimed
Source: History of the Electoral Districts, Legislatures and Ministries of the Province of Ontario

1879 Ontario general election: Algoma
Party	Candidate	Votes	%
Liberal	Robert Adam Lyon	1,081	53.86
Conservative	Mr. Macdonald	926	46.14
Total valid votes		2,007	96.58
Eligible voters		2,078	
Liberal hold			
Source: Elections Ontario
