= Albert Grigg =

Ontario MPP
- In office 1908–1915
- Preceded by: William Ross Smyth
- Succeeded by: John Morrow Robb
- Constituency: Algoma

Personal details
- Born: May 9, 1873; Huron County, Ontario
- Died: October 24, 1959 (aged 86); Algoma District, Ontario
- Political party: Conservative
- Spouse: Jane Rowe
- Profession: Businessman

Albert Grigg (May 9, 1873 – October 24, 1959) was an Ontario merchant and political figure. He represented Algoma in the Legislative Assembly of Ontario as a Conservative member from 1908 to 1915. He stepped down in 1915 to become deputy minister of the Department of Lands, Forests and Mines.

He was born in Huron County, Ontario, the son of William Grigg, and educated in Bruce Mines. He married Jane Rowe. Grigg served as reeve for Plummer Township and was mayor of Bruce Mines for 37 years.

He was known by his party as the "tall, silver tongued orator".

He died in 1959.
