= John Fullerton (politician) =

Canadian politician (1912–1965)

Ontario MPP
- In office 1945–1963
- Preceded by: Wilfred Miller
- Succeeded by: Stan Farquhar
- Constituency: Algoma—Manitoulin

Personal details
- Born: May 12, 1912 Thessalon, Ontario
- Died: July 6, 1965 (aged 53) Toronto, Ontario
- Party: Progressive Conservative
- Spouse: Marian Dobie
- Children: 4
- Occupation: Funeral director

John Arthur Fullerton (May 12, 1912 – July 5, 1965) was a politician in Ontario, Canada. He was a Progressive Conservative member of the Legislative Assembly of Ontario from 1945 to 1963. He represented the riding of Algoma—Manitoulin.

== Background ==
He was born in Thessalon, Ontario, the son of James Albert Fullerton, and educated there. In 1938, he married Marian Dobie. Fullerton was a furniture dealer and funeral director. He served on the town council and was also a master in the local Masonic lodge. He and Marian raised four children.

== Politics ==
In 1945, Fullerton ran as the Progressive Conservative candidate in the northern Ontario riding of Algoma—Manitoulin. He defeated Liberal candidate J.F. McDermid by 419 votes. He was re-elected in 1948, 1951, 1955 and 1959.

In 1963, he was defeated by Liberal candidate Stan Farquhar by 1,644 votes. Fullerton attributed his loss to "free beer and cocktail parties" given out by the opposition. Others believed that the loss was due to a controversial relocation of a senior's residence that was to be built in Espanola but was instead moved to his own home town of Thessalon.
