= Algoma (provincial electoral district) =

Former provincial electoral district in Ontario, Canada

Ontario electoral district

Defunct provincial electoral district
- Legislature: Legislative Assembly of Ontario
- District created: 1867
- District abolished: 1996 (Note: Riding was abolished between 1883 and 1902 and again from 1934 to 1967.)
- First contested: 1867
- Last contested: 1995

Algoma was an electoral riding in Ontario, Canada. It was created in 1867 at the time of confederation. In 1885 it was split into two: Algoma East and Algoma West. In 1902 it was re-established as a single riding and was abolished in 1933 before the 1934 election. In 1967 it was re-established a second time and lasted until 1999 when it was merged into Algoma—Manitoulin.

== Members of Provincial Parliament ==
=== Algoma (1867–1885) ===
Algoma
Assembly	Years	Member	Party
1st	1867–1871	Frederick William Cumberland	Conservative
2nd	1871–1874	Frederick William Cumberland	Conservative
3rd	1875–1878	Simon James Dawson	Liberal
3rd	1878–1879	Robert Adam Lyon	Liberal
4th	1879–1883	Robert Adam Lyon	Liberal
5th	1883–1885 (Note: Riding was split in two part way through the 5th assembly.)	Robert Adam Lyon	Liberal
Sourced from the Ontario Legislative Assembly
Split into Algoma East and Algoma West in 1885

=== Algoma East ===
Algoma East
Assembly	Years	Member	Party
6th	1886–1890	Robert Adam Lyon	Liberal
7th	1890–1894	Alexander Franklin Campbell	Conservative
8th	1894–1898	Charles Franklin Farwell	Liberal
9th	1898–1902	Charles Franklin Farwell	Liberal
Sourced from the Ontario Legislative Assembly

=== Algoma West ===
Algoma East
Assembly	Years	Member	Party
6th	1886–1890	James Conmee	Liberal
7th	1890–1894	James Conmee	Liberal
8th	1894–1895	James M. Savage	Conservative
8th	1895–1898	James Conmee	Liberal
9th	1898–1902	James Conmee	Liberal
Sourced from the Ontario Legislative Assembly

=== Algoma (1902–1934) ===
Algoma
Assembly	Years	Member	Party
10th	1902–1904	William Ross Smyth	Conservative
11th	1905–1908	William Ross Smyth	Conservative
12th	1908–1911	Albert Grigg	Conservative
13th	1911–1914	Albert Grigg	Conservative
14th	1914–1919	John Morrow Robb	Conservative
15th	1919–1923	Kenneth Spencer Stover	Liberal
16th	1923–1926	Arthur Gladstone Wallis	Liberal
17th	1926–1929	John Morrow Robb	Conservative
18th	1929–1934	John Morrow Robb	Conservative
Sourced from the Ontario Legislative Assembly
Merged into Algoma—Manitoulin before the 1934 election

=== Algoma (1967–1999) ===
Algoma
Assembly	Years	Member	Party
28th	1967–1971	Bernt Gilbertson	Progressive Conservative
29th	1971–1975	Bernt Gilbertson	Progressive Conservative
30th	1975–1977	Bud Wildman	New Democratic
31st	1977–1981	Bud Wildman	New Democratic
32nd	1981–1985	Bud Wildman	New Democratic
33rd	1985–1987	Bud Wildman	New Democratic
34th	1987–1990	Bud Wildman	New Democratic
35th	1990–1995	Bud Wildman	New Democratic
36th	1995–1999	Bud Wildman	New Democratic
Sourced from the Ontario Legislative Assembly
Merged into Algoma—Manitoulin before the 1999 election

== Election results ==
=== 1967–1999 ===
1995 Ontario general election
Party	Candidate	Votes	%	±%
New Democratic	Bud Wildman	6,190	44.47	–14.18
Progressive Conservative	Phil Sabine	4,602	33.06	+29.97
Liberal	Paula Dunning	3,128	22.47	–3.02
Total valid votes		13,920	99.44	
Total rejected, unmarked and declined ballots		78	0.56	+0.20
Turnout		13,998	64.02	–1.60
Eligible voters		21,864		
New Democratic hold		Swing		–22.08
Source: Elections Ontario

1990 Ontario general election
Party	Candidate	Votes	%	±%
New Democratic	Bud Wildman	8,221	58.65	–2.25
Liberal	Robert Gallagher	3,573	25.49	–5.06
Confederation of Regions	Stanley Down	1,790	12.77	–
Progressive Conservative	J.G. Denis Latulippe	433	3.09	–5.46
Total valid votes		14,017	99.64	
Total rejected, unmarked and declined ballots		50	0.36	–0.01
Turnout		14,067	65.62	–3.13
Eligible voters		21,437		
New Democratic hold		Swing		+3.65
Source: Elections Ontario

1987 Ontario general election
Party	Candidate	Votes	%	±%
New Democratic	Bud Wildman	8,562	60.90	+7.79
Liberal	Bryan McDougall	4,295	30.55	+9.55
Progressive Conservative	Denise Chenier-Tulonen	1,202	8.55	–17.35
Total valid votes		14,059	99.64	
Total rejected ballots		51	0.36	+0.07
Turnout		14,110	68.75	–1.80
Eligible voters		20,525		
New Democratic hold		Swing		–0.88
Source: Elections Ontario

1985 Ontario general election
Party	Candidate	Votes	%	±%
New Democratic	Bud Wildman	7,575	53.11	+0.28
Progressive Conservative	Jim Thibert	3,694	25.90	–9.61
Liberal	Bryan McDougall	2,995	21.00	+9.33
Total valid votes		14,264	99.71	
Total rejected ballots		42	0.29	+0.02
Turnout		14,306	70.54	+1.34
Eligible voters		20,280		
New Democratic hold		Swing		+4.95
Source: Elections Ontario

1981 Ontario general election
Party	Candidate	Votes	%	±%
New Democratic	Bud Wildman	7,096	52.83	+4.12
Progressive Conservative	Vyrn Peterson	4,770	35.51	–4.98
Liberal	Dan Koob	1,567	11.67	+0.86
Total valid votes		13,433	99.73	
Total rejected ballots		37	0.27	–0.10
Turnout		13,470	69.20	–8.34
Eligible voters		19,466		
New Democratic hold		Swing		+4.55
Source: Elections Ontario

1977 Ontario general election
Party	Candidate	Votes	%	±%
New Democratic	Bud Wildman	6,917	48.70	+10.13
Progressive Conservative	Dave Liddle	5,751	40.49	+5.04
Liberal	Gabriel Tremblay	1,534	10.80	–15.17
Total valid votes		14,202	99.62	
Total rejected ballots		54	0.38	+0.11
Turnout		14,256	77.54	+5.59
Eligible voters		18,386		
New Democratic hold		Swing		+2.55
Source: Elections Ontario

1975 Ontario general election
Party	Candidate	Votes	%	±%
New Democratic	Bud Wildman	4,923	38.57	+7.66
Progressive Conservative	Bernt Gilbertson	4,525	35.45	–6.75
Liberal	Ralph D. Nelson	3,315	25.97	–0.91
Total valid votes		12,763	99.73	
Total rejected ballots		35	0.27	–0.22
Turnout		12,798	71.94	–1.94
Eligible voters		17,789		
New Democratic gain from Progressive Conservative		Swing		+7.20
Source: Elections Ontario

1971 Ontario general election
Party	Candidate	Votes	%	±%
Progressive Conservative	Bernt Gilbertson	5,222	42.20	+1.96
New Democratic	Paul St. Jacques	3,825	30.91	+2.38
Liberal	Terry Grywinski	3,326	26.88	–4.33
Total valid votes		12,373	99.51	
Total rejected ballots		61	0.49	–0.19
Turnout		12,434	73.88	+7.15
Eligible voters		16,829		
Progressive Conservative hold		Swing		–0.21
Source: Elections Ontario

1967 Ontario general election
Party	Candidate	Votes	%
Progressive Conservative	Bernt Gilbertson	3,956	40.25
Liberal	Jack R. MacDonald	3,068	31.21
New Democratic	Agnes Turcott	2,805	28.54
Total valid votes		9,829	99.32
Total rejected ballots		67	0.68
Turnout		9,896	66.73
Eligible voters		14,830	
Source: Elections Ontario

=== 1902–1930 ===
Ontario provincial by-election, October 18, 1930 Ministerial by-election
Party	Candidate	Votes
Conservative	John Morrow Robb	acclaimed
Source: Elections Ontario

1929 Ontario general election
Party	Candidate	Votes	%	±%
Conservative	John Morrow Robb	4,565	67.49	+6.17
Liberal	Charles A. Young	2,199	32.51	–
Total valid votes		6,764	98.69	
Total rejected ballots		90	1.31	+0.88
Turnout		6,854	63.73	+9.36
Eligible voters		10,755		
Conservative hold		Swing		+3.09
Source: Elections Ontario

1926 Ontario general election
Party	Candidate	Votes	%	±%
Conservative	John Morrow Robb	3,527	61.32	+25.47
Progressive Party	William Rowan	2,225	38.68	–
Total valid votes		5,752	99.57	
Total rejected ballots		25	0.43	–0.55
Turnout		5,777	54.37	–13.46
Eligible voters		10,625		
Conservative gain from Liberal		Swing		+12.73
Source: Elections Ontario

1923 Ontario general election
Party	Candidate	Votes	%	±%
Liberal	Arthur Gladstone Wallis	2,365	36.06	+0.57
Conservative	John Morrow Robb	2,351	35.85	+1.05
United Farmers	Thomas Higgins	1,842	28.09	–1.62
Total valid votes		6,558	99.02	
Total rejected ballots		65	0.98	–0.47
Turnout		6,623	67.83	–0.77
Eligible voters		9,764		
Liberal hold		Swing		–0.24
Source: Elections Ontario

1919 Ontario general election
Party	Candidate	Votes	%	±%
Liberal	Kenneth Spencer Stover	2,270	35.49	–
Conservative	John Morrow Robb	2,226	34.80	–
United Farmers	John Egerton Wright	1,900	29.71	–
Total valid votes		6,396	98.55	
Total rejected ballots		94	1.45	–
Turnout		6,490	68.60	–
Eligible voters		9,461		
Liberal gain from Conservative				
Source: Elections Ontario

Ontario provincial by-election, October, 25 1915 Appointment of Albert Grigg as Deputy Minister of Crown Lands on October 7, 1915
Party	Candidate	Votes
Conservative	John Morrow Robb	acclaimed

1914 Ontario general election
Party	Candidate	Votes	%	±%
Conservative	Albert Grigg	1,959	56.50	–5.36
Liberal	George James McArthur	1,508	43.50	+5.36
Total valid votes		3,467	99.48	
Total rejected ballots		18	0.52	+0.19
Turnout		3,485	74.32	+20.98
Eligible voters		4,689		
Conservative hold		Swing		–5.36
Source: Elections Ontario

1911 Ontario general election
Party	Candidate	Votes	%	±%
Conservative	Albert Grigg	1,723	61.87	–
Liberal	Thomas G. Wigg	1,062	38.13	–
Total valid votes		2,785	99.68	
Total rejected ballots		9	0.32	–
Turnout		2,794	53.34	–
Eligible voters		5,238		
Conservative hold				
Source: Elections Ontario

Ontario provincial by-election, June 8, 1908 Resignation of William Ross Smyth
Party	Candidate	Votes
Conservative	Albert Grigg	acclaimed

1908 Ontario general election
Party	Candidate	Votes	%	±%
Conservative	William Ross Smyth	2,134	60.95	+5.74
Liberal	John McKay	1,367	39.05	–5.74
Total valid votes		3,501	99.35	
Total rejected ballots		23	0.65	–0.38
Turnout		3,524	80.70	+23.23
Eligible voters		4,367		
Conservative hold		Swing		+5.74
Source: Elections Ontario

1905 Ontario general election
Party	Candidate	Votes	%	±%
Conservative	William Ross Smyth	2,064	55.22	+1.76
Liberal	Thomas S. Wigg	1,674	44.78	–1.76
Total valid votes		3,738	98.97	
Total rejected ballots		39	1.03	–0.20
Turnout		3,777	57.46	+3.93
Eligible voters		6,573		
Conservative hold		Swing		+1.76
Source: Elections Ontario

1902 Ontario general election
Party	Candidate	Votes	%
Conservative	William Ross Smyth	1,753	53.46
Liberal	D. M. Brodie	1,526	46.54
Total valid votes		3,279	98.77
Total rejected ballots		41	1.23
Turnout		3,320	53.53
Eligible voters		6,202	
Source: Elections Ontario

=== Algoma East 1886–1902 ===
1898 Ontario general election: Algoma East
Party	Candidate	Votes	%	±%
Liberal	Charles Franklin Farwell	2,833	52.55	+1.70
Conservative	Dr. Fell	2,558	47.45	–1.70
Total valid votes		5,391	98.36	
Total rejected ballots		90	1.64	–0.96
Turnout		5,481	45.93	–4.55
Eligible voters		11,934		
Liberal hold		Swing		+1.70
Source: Elections Ontario

1894 Ontario general election: Algoma East
Party	Candidate	Votes	%	±%
Liberal	Charles Franklin Farwell	1,982	50.85	+1.82
Conservative	William Howard Hearst	1,916	49.15	–1.82
Total valid votes		3,898	97.40	
Total rejected ballots		104	2.60	+2.05
Turnout		4,002	50.48	–60.06
Eligible voters		7,928		
Liberal gain from Conservative		Swing		+1.82
Source: Elections Ontario

1890 Ontario general election: Algoma East
Party	Candidate	Votes	%
Conservative	Alexander Franklin Campbell	1,569	50.97
Liberal	Robert Adam Lyon	1,509	49.03
Total valid votes		3,078	99.45
Total rejected ballots		17	0.55
Turnout		3,095	110.54
Eligible voters		2,800	
Conservative gain from Liberal			
Source: Elections Ontario

1886 Ontario general election: Algoma East
Party	Candidate	Votes
Liberal	Robert Adam Lyon	acclaimed
Source: Elections Ontario

Ontario provincial by-election, June 15, 1885: Algoma East
Party	Candidate	Votes	%
Liberal	Robert Adam Lyon	1,390	69.19
Conservative	Abbott	619	30.81
Total valid votes		2,009	100.00
Total rejected ballots		–	
Turnout		2,009	
Source: Elections Ontario

=== Algoma West 1885–1902 ===
1898 Ontario general election: Algoma West
Party	Candidate	Votes	%	±%
Liberal	James Conmee	1,723	54.61	–0.71
Conservative	C. W. Chadwick	1,432	45.39	+0.71
Total valid votes		3,155	98.56	
Total rejected ballots		46	1.44	+1.44
Turnout		3,201	51.55	–
Eligible voters		6,210		
Liberal hold		Swing		–0.71
Source: Elections Ontario

Ontario provincial by-election, February 9, 1895: Algoma West
Party	Candidate	Votes	%	±%
Liberal	James Conmee	1,398	55.32	+5.45
Conservative	J.C. King	1,129	44.68	–5.45
Total valid votes		2,527	100.00	
Total rejected ballots		–		
Turnout		2,527	–	
Eligible voters				
Liberal gain from Conservative		Swing		+5.45
Source: Elections Ontario

1894 Ontario general election: Algoma West
Party	Candidate	Votes	%	±%
Conservative	James Savage	1,137	50.13	+2.08
Liberal	James Conmee	1,131	49.87	–2.08
Total valid votes		2,268	98.78	
Total rejected ballots		28	1.22	+0.82
Turnout		2,296	52.42	–64.43
Eligible voters		4,380		
Conservative gain from Liberal		Swing		+2.08
Source: Elections Ontario

1890 Ontario general election: Algoma West
Party	Candidate	Votes	%
Liberal	James Conmee	786	51.95
Conservative	George Hugh Macdonell	727	48.05
Total valid votes		1,513	99.61
Total rejected ballots		6	0.40
Turnout		1,519	116.85
Eligible voters		1,300	
Liberal hold			
Source: Elections Ontario

1886 Ontario general election: Algoma West
Party	Candidate	Votes
Liberal	James Conmee	acclaimed
Source: Elections Ontario

Ontario provincial by-election, June 23, 1885: Algoma West
Party	Candidate	Votes	%
Liberal	James Conmee	410	55.63
Conservative	Gough	327	44.37
Total valid votes		737	100.00
Total rejected ballots			
Turnout		737	–
Source: Elections Ontario

=== 1867–1885 ===
1883 Ontario general election
Party	Candidate	Votes	%	±%
Liberal	Robert Adam Lyon	1,625	51.82	–2.04
Conservative	W. Plummer	1,511	48.18	+2.04
Total valid votes		3,136	98.83	
Total rejected ballots		37	1.17	+1.17
Turnout		3,173	–	–
Eligible voters				
Liberal hold		Swing		–2.04
Source: Elections Ontario

1879 Ontario general election
Party	Candidate	Votes	%
Liberal	Robert Adam Lyon	1,081	53.86
Conservative	Mr. Macdonald	926	46.14
Total valid votes		2,007	100.00
Total rejected ballots		–	
Turnout		2,007	96.58
Eligible voters		2,078	
Liberal hold			
Source: Elections Ontario

Ontario provincial by-election, September 1878 Resignation of Simon James Dawson
Party	Candidate	Votes
Liberal	Robert Adam Lyon	Acclaimed
Source: History of the Electoral Districts, Legislatures and Ministries of the Province of Ontario

1875 Ontario general election
Party	Candidate	Votes	%
Liberal	Simon James Dawson	510	64.31
Conservative	E. Biggins	283	35.69
Total valid votes		793	100.00
Total rejected ballots		–	
Turnout		793	91.25
Eligible voters		869	
Liberal gain from Conservative			
Source: Elections Ontario

1871 Ontario general election
Party	Candidate	Votes
Conservative	Frederick William Cumberland	Acclaimed
Source: Elections Ontario

1867 Ontario general election
Party	Candidate	Votes	%
Conservative	Frederick William Cumberland	351	67.89
Liberal	W.H. Palmer	127	24.56
Independent	Mr. Duncan	39	7.54
Total valid votes		517	100.00
Total rejected ballots		–	
Turnout		517	60.19
Eligible voters		859	
Conservative pickup new district.			
Source: Elections Ontario

== See also ==
- List of Ontario provincial electoral districts
- Canadian provincial electoral districts
