= Wilfred Lynn Miller =

Canadian politician

Wilfred Miller

Ontario MPP
- In office 1934–1945
- Preceded by: New riding
- Succeeded by: John Fullerton
- Constituency: Algoma—Manitoulin

Personal details
- Born: March 7, 1892; Bruce Mines, Ontario
- Died: 1985 (aged 92–93); Thessalon, Ontario
- Political party: Liberal
- Spouse: Eve Maria Hand (m. 1919)
- Occupation: Funeral director

Wilfred Lynn Miller (March 7, 1892 – 1985) was a politician in Ontario, Canada. He represented Algoma—Manitoulin in the Legislative Assembly of Ontario from 1934 to 1945 as a Liberal.

The son of Robert Edward Miller and Christina Jane Trevillion, he was born in Bruce Mines and was educated there. In 1919, Miller married Eva Elizabeth Hand. He was a furniture dealer, funeral director and insurance agent. Miller was also area representative for Bell Telephone. He served during World War I. Miller was one of the founding members of the local Chamber of Commerce and also served as its president. After retiring from provincial politics, he served as mayor of Bruce Mines. In 1977, Miller and his wife moved to Thessalon. He died in 1985 and is buried in Cloudslee Cemetery.
