= John Gordon Lane =

Canadian politician

John Lane

Ontario MPP
- In office 1971–1987
- Preceded by: Stanley Farquhar
- Succeeded by: Mike Brown
- Constituency: Algoma—Manitoulin

Personal details
- Born: August 5, 1916; Barrie Island, Ontario
- Died: August 9, 2001 (aged 85)
- Political party: Progressive Conservative
- Spouse: Louise
- Children: 2
- Occupation: Farmer, insurance executive

John Gordon Lane (August 5, 1916 – August 9, 2001) was a politician in Ontario, Canada. He served in the Legislative Assembly of Ontario from 1971 to 1987 as a Progressive Conservative.

== Background ==
Lane was born on Barrie Island, Ontario, the eldest son of six children of George and Martha Lane who farmed on Barrie Island almost all their adult lives. His father George was born in England and migrated to Canada around 1890. Lane was educated at Ontario schools until age fourteen, and worked as a farmer and insurance executive. With wife Louise, he had two children, Sharon and Ronald.

== Politics ==
Lane served as a councillor in Barrie Island from 1941 to 1960, and as a councillor in Gore Bay for four years. He was mayor of Gore Bay from 1967 to 1972.

He was elected to the Ontario legislature in the 1971 provincial election, defeating New Democrat Roger Taylor by 1,298 votes in the northern constituency of Algoma—Manitoulin. Lane defeated NDP challenger Winston Baker by 1,127 votes in the 1975 election, and won more convincingly in 1977. He did not face serious challenges in the elections of 1981 and 1985.

Lane was a government backbencher until 1985, when the Progressive Conservative ministry led by Frank Miller was defeated in the legislature. In opposition, he served as his party's critic for Agriculture and Tourism and Recreation. He did not run for re-election in the 1987 provincial election because he wished to spend more time with his family.

Lane was known as a strong defender of his constituency interests. Premier Bill Davis once singled out Lane and Ron McNeil as the two backbenchers who most frequently wrote to him about constituency issues. Also a strong defender of northern interests, Lane supported the creation of a Ministry of Northern Development and Mines, and served as parliamentary assistant to the first minister.

== Later life ==
Lane died in 2001, four days after his 85th birthday. Members of the Legislative Assembly of Ontario spoke in his honour on October 1 of the same year.
