= Bill Rosenberg =

Canadian politician

Bill Rosenberg MPP
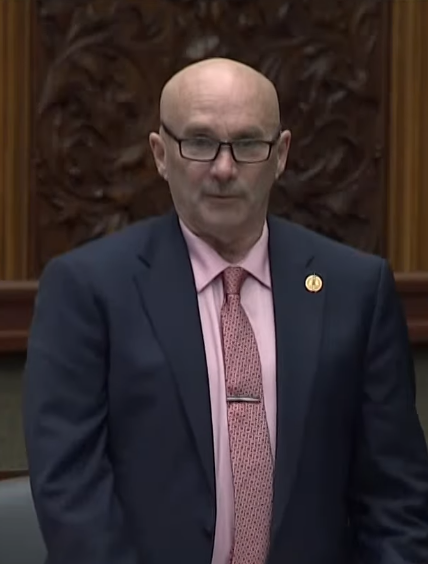
- Rosenberg in 2025

Member of the Ontario Provincial Parliament for Algoma—Manitoulin
- Incumbent
- Assumed office February 27, 2025
- Preceded by: Michael Mantha

Personal details
- Party: Progressive Conservative

Bill Rosenberg is a Canadian politician, who was elected as a member of Provincial Parliament (MPP) in the 2025 Ontario general election. He represents the electoral district of Algoma—Manitoulin as a member of the Ontario Progressive Conservative Party.

Prior to his election to the legislature, he served as mayor of Thessalon.
