= James Savage (politician) =

Canadian politician

Member of the Ontario Provincial Parliament for Algoma West
- In office June 26, 1894 – January 28, 1898
- Preceded by: James Conmee
- Succeeded by: James Conmee

Personal details
- Party: Conservative

James M. Savage was a Canadian politician from Ontario. He represented Algoma West in the Legislative Assembly of Ontario from 1894 to 1898.

== See also ==
- 8th Parliament of Ontario
