= Arthur Gladstone Wallis =

Canadian politician from Ontario

Member of the Ontario Provincial Parliament for Algoma
- In office June 25, 1923 – October 18, 1926
- Preceded by: Kenneth Spencer Stover
- Succeeded by: John Morrow Robb

Personal details
- Party: Liberal

Arthur Gladstone Wallis was a Canadian politician from Ontario. He represented Algoma in the Legislative Assembly of Ontario from 1923 to 1926.

== See also ==
- 16th Parliament of Ontario
