= Charles Franklin Farwell =

Canadian politician

Ontario MPP
- In office 1894–1902
- Preceded by: Alexander Franklin Campbell
- Succeeded by: Riding abolished
- Constituency: Algoma East

Personal details
- Born: December 24, 1860 East Whitby Township, Canada West
- Died: March 26, 1921 (aged 60) Oshawa, Ontario
- Party: Liberal
- Occupation: Lawyer

Charles Franklin Farwell, KC (December 24, 1860 – March 26, 1921) was an Ontario lawyer and political figure. He represented Algoma East in the Legislative Assembly of Ontario as a Liberal member from 1894 to 1902.

He was born in East Whitby Township, Canada West (now Whitby, Ontario), the son of Charles Farwell, and educated in Oshawa. He studied law, was called to the Ontario bar and was later named King's Counsel. Farwell lived in Sault Ste. Marie. After his term in office, he was named Registrar for Algoma. Farwell also served as a Master in the local Masonic Lodge.

He died in 1921.
