= Kirby Page =

American clergyman (1890–1957)

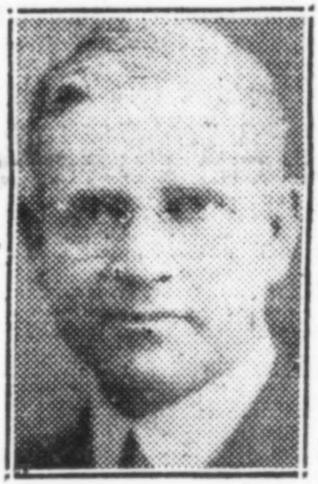
Page c. 1935

Kirby Page (1890–1957) was an American Disciples of Christ minister, an author, and a peace activist.

== Life ==
In 1890 Kirby Page was born in Tyler County, Texas after which his family moved frequently. The father deserted the family when Kirby was nine years old. In 1905 his mother moved the family to Pasadena, Californian for two years and then returned to Texas. In Houston, Kirby attended a business college and succeeded in advancing in the YMCA to the position of assistant to the general secretary. He became engaged to Mary Alma Folse. In 1911 he began studies at Drake University in Des Moines, Iowa, focusing on Bible literature and the social sciences, the languages of Greek and German, and missionary work within Drake's Student Volunteer Movement. Following graduation as a Phi Beta Kappa, he was ordained as a minister in the Disciples of Christ.

In his continued work with the YMCA, he would become the personal secretary to Sherwood Eddy, the evangelism secretary. Together, they ministered to Allied soldiers in Britain and France and traveled on evangelistic campaigns in the Far East. In 1919, as pastor of the Brooklyn-based Ridgewood Heights Church of Christ Kirby was able to build a neighborhood community center, the plans for which he described in his article Page, Kirby. "The Challenge of New York City."

In 1921, with support from Sherwood Eddy, he began a career as an independent social evangelist for the Social Gospel at a time when "a mere fraction of clergymen felt impelled to enter the zone of controversy as spokesmen for the social ethics of our Lord." Page and Eddy led the Christian pacifist group called "Fellowship for a Christian Social Order" in 1921. This organization was later to merge with the Fellowship of Reconciliation in 1928. According to Gaustad and Noll's A Documentary History of Religion in America, after World War I,

the sentiment for peace spread ever more widely throughout American society, [and] minister after minister, church after church, lined up to issue a renunciation of war. War was "utterly destructive," entirely "nefarious," hopelessly "archaic," and totally "incompatible with the teaching and example of our Lord Jesus Christ." A Disciples of Christ minister, Kirby Page (1890-1957), proved a most effective and vigorous leader in rallying the churches behind the cause for peace. Peace was his passion, a passion manifest in hundreds of lectures and magazine articles (he even edited the important pacifist organ, The World Tomorrow, from 1926 to 1934) and more than two dozen books whose impact reached far beyond the borders of the United States. (Vol 2, pp. 134-135)

In 1927 Page warned that U.S. interests in imperial expansion would lead to entanglement in the international war system. He supported to some extent, the outlawry of war movement, led by men such as Salmon Levinson, John Dewey, Charles Clayton Morrison, Senator William E. Borah and Raymond Robins, but argued that it would remain an insufficient unilateral action without international organizations for enforcement and cooperation. As the movement came to fruition in the Kellogg–Briand Pact of 1928, Page exposed shortcomings of the agreement, and criticized the movement's continued focus on nationalism. He supported the League of Nations and the World Court, but with reservations, recognizing their limitations in a context of the rival military industrial empires. He believed that the League consisted of an excessively restricted membership of war-victors, and that politics too severely limited the Court's powers.

In 1929 Page's Jesus or Christianity: A Study in Contrasts he contrasts the simple faith of a historical Jesus with the historical development of formal religious organizations and their clergy. He portrays the resulting dogma and actions of respective religious leaders as being in diametric opposition against their nominal founder. He argued that this devolution was a result of historical forces effecting the social development and political survival of these organizations. In his words, "Christianity, it has accumulated so many alien and hostile elements as to make it a different religion from the simple faith of its founder." He declares: "As long as ministers and laymen labor under the delusion that contemporary Christianity is the same religion that Jesus practiced, they will remain immunized against his way of life and will lack the vision." He proclaims to Christians: "Live to-day as if the ideal society has already come to pass. The Kingdom of God is within you. It is all about you." He says, "The Father of the prodigal son could never consign his child to eternal flames."

He maintained that historically the peaceful message of Christ was distorted into a religion of war by Constantine the Great, by the Crusades, and by the Church being deeply embedded in the medieval feudal system. He states that Christianity became a religion based upon magic and borrowed pagan beliefs. "By the Fourth Century many forms of magic had crept Into the Christian church. Mariolatry and the worship of saints was widespread. Exorcism of evil spirits had been long practiced, frequently in ways very similar to pagan rites. By the ignorant and uncultured, baptism was often thought to possess magical efficacy. In the Holy Communion the miracle of transubstantiation was thought to occur."

Page joined the Socialist Party of America in 1930. In 1933, he warned that due to the economic collapse from the depression; fascism, anarchy and communism were looming on the horizon, and recommended that capitalism be replaced by democratic socialism. He expressed his interpretation of this aspect of the Social Gospel in Individualism and Socialism as follows:

The thesis which has been supported throughout this volume is that the present economic order is intolerable on economic, political, and moral grounds, and it is my purpose now to summarize the reasons why capitalism and individualism, or any other designation of the existing system, is irreconcilable with the religion of Jesus and that of the prophets of Israel. It is my contention that the present generation of religious leaders, with conspicuous exceptions, have been afflicted with the same ethical obtuseness which caused our forefathers to sanction slavery, serfdom, and tyranny. Down to the financial crash of 1929—and well beyond—capitalism was being accepted and extolled by an overwhelming proportion of religious people in this country, alike among the clergy and the laity. Perhaps about the same proportion as the supporters of slavery numbered in the Southern States in 1860!

Kirby Page believed that true Christians should work tirelessly, not only for faith in, but in active social progress toward, the Kingdom of God on earth. His convictions rested on the belief that man, as a child of God, must work toward developing his inherently good nature as revealed by the life of Jesus. Working as a community or family of God, man must "lay hold of spiritual resources and relieve human misery, transform unjust social systems, gain vision and serenity through silence ... and run risks."

Kirby Page died in 1957 and his contributions were attributed to him in a memoriam by Nevin Sayre on March 1, 1958. He was survived by his wife, Mary Alma (Folse) Page, Kirby Page, Jr., and Mary Page Raitt. A collection of his correspondence, manuscript, newspaper clippings, and incompleted autobiography is available on the Internet Archive, and the physical collection is held at the Disciples Historical Society in Bethany, West Virginia.

== Selected bibliography ==
- Page, Kirby (1920). Something More. New York: Association Press.
- —— (1921). Sword or the Cross. Chicago: Christian Century Press.
- —— (1922). Christianity and Economic Problems. New York: Association Press.
- —— (1923). War, Its Causes, Consequences and Cure. New York: George H. Doran Co.
- Eddy, Sherwood; Kirby Page (1924). The Abolition of War. New York: George H. Doran.
- —— (1925). An American Peace Policy. New York: George H. Doran Co.
- —— (1925). Imperialism and Nationalism. New York: George H. Doran Co.
- Eddy, Sherwood; Kirby Page (1926). Makers of Freedom: biographical sketches in social progress. New York: George H. Doran Company. ISBN 0-8369-1803-7.

- republished in 1970 by Books for Libraries Press, ISBN 0-8369-1803-7

- —— (1927). Dollars and World Peace. New York: George H. Doran Co. ISBN 9780824002978.
- —— (1928). The Monroe Doctrine and world peace; an analysis of the replies from 301 leaders of public opinion to eight questions concerning the meaning and significance of this famous doctrine. Garden City, NY: Doubleday, Doran & company.
- ——, ed. (1928). Recent Gains in American Civilization. New York: Harcourt, Brace & Co.
- ——, ed. (1929). Jesus or Christianity: A Study in Contrasts. New York: Doubleday, Doran & Co., Inc.
- —— (1930). Is Mahatma Gandhi the greatest man of the age? A biographical interpretation and an analysis of the political situation in India. New York: K. Page.
- ——, ed. (1930). A New Economic Order. New York: Harcourt, Brace & Co.
- —— (1931). National Defense: A Study in the Origins, Results, and Prevention of War. New York: Farrar & Rinehart.
- —— (1932). The Personality of Jesus: pathways by which he climbed the heights of life. New York: Association Press.
- —— (1932). Living Creatively. New York: Farrar & Rinehart.
- —— (1933). Individualism and Socialism. New York: Farrar & Rinehart.
- —— (1934). Living Triumphantly. New York: Farrar & Rinehart.
- —— (1936). Living courageously. New York: Farrar & Rinehart.
- Eddy, Sherwood; Kirby Page (1937). Creative Powers. New York: Association Press.
- —— (1937). Must We Go To War?. New York: Farrar & Rinehart.
- —— (1939). Religious Resources for Personal Living and Social Action. New York: Farrar & Rinehart.
- —— (1941). Living Prayerfully. New York: Farrar & Rinehart.
- —— (1944). Living Abundantly, a study of creative pioneer groups through twenty-seven centuries of exploration of pathways to joyous and abundant life. New York: Farrar & Rinehart.
- —— (1945). The Will of God for These Days. La Habra, CA: Kirby Page.
- —— (1946). The Light is Still Shining in the Darkness. La Habra, CA: Kirby Page.
- —— (1948). The Meek Shall Inherit the Earth: Reflections on the Fate of Our Civilization. La Habra, CA.
- —— (1950). Now is the Time to Prevent the Third World War. La Habra, CA: Kirby Page.

- republished in 1972(with a new introduction by John M. Swomley, Jr.) Garland, New York ISBN 0-8240-0275-X
- republished in 2007 by Brewster Press, ISBN 978-1-4067-4004-2, ISBN 1-4067-4004-7

- —— (1950). The Creative Revolution of Jesus: Then and Now. La Habra, CA: Kirby Page.
- —— (1950). Living Joyously. La Habra, CA: Kirby Page.
- ——; Harold Edward Fey (1975). Kirby Page, Social Evangelist: the autobiography of a 20th century prophet for peace. New York: Fellowship Press. (159 pages)
- —— (1976). Kirby Page and the Social Gospel: An anthology. New York: Garland Pub. ISBN 0-8240-0451-5.
