= Sherwood Eddy =

American Protestant missionary, administrator and educator

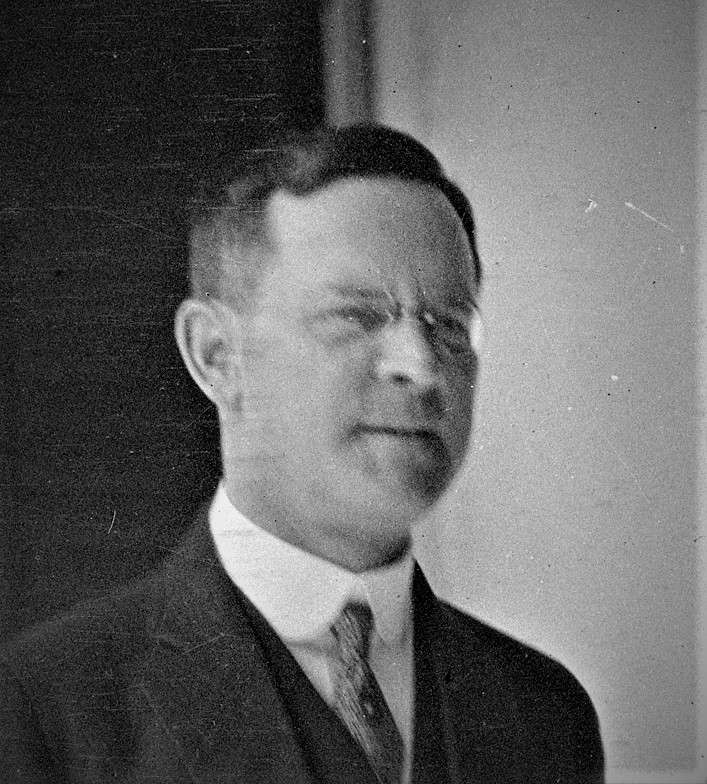
- Born: George Sherwood Eddy; January 19, 1871; Leavenworth, Kansas
- Died: March 4, 1963 (aged 92); Jacksonville, Illinois
- Education: Phillips Andover Academy, Yale University, Princeton Theological Seminary
- Known for: Evangelism and YMCA international leadership
- Spouses: Alice Maud Harriet Arden; Louise Gates

George Sherwood Eddy (1871–1963) was an American Protestant missionary, administrator and educator. He authored numerous works and traveled extensively to promote dialogue and understanding between missionaries and local communities, particularly in Asia and the Middle East. He played a role in establishing networks of Christian intellectuals across different regions. His contributions to Protestant communities in the United States and abroad have been recognized as influential. From the 1930s onwards, he became a Christian socialist.

== Biography ==
=== Early life and family ===
George Sherwood Eddy was born on January 19, 1871, to George Alfred Eddy and Margaret Louise Norton at Leavenworth, Kansas. His father was a businessman and was active in civil affairs, and his family had roots in the Northeastern United States. Eddy attended Phillips Andover Academy, and graduated Yale College with a degree in engineering in 1891. Eddy married Alice Maud Harriet Arden (1873–1945) on November 10, 1898. They were the parents of two children, Margaret and Arden. After Alice's death, he married Catherine Louise Gates in 1946.

=== Career ===
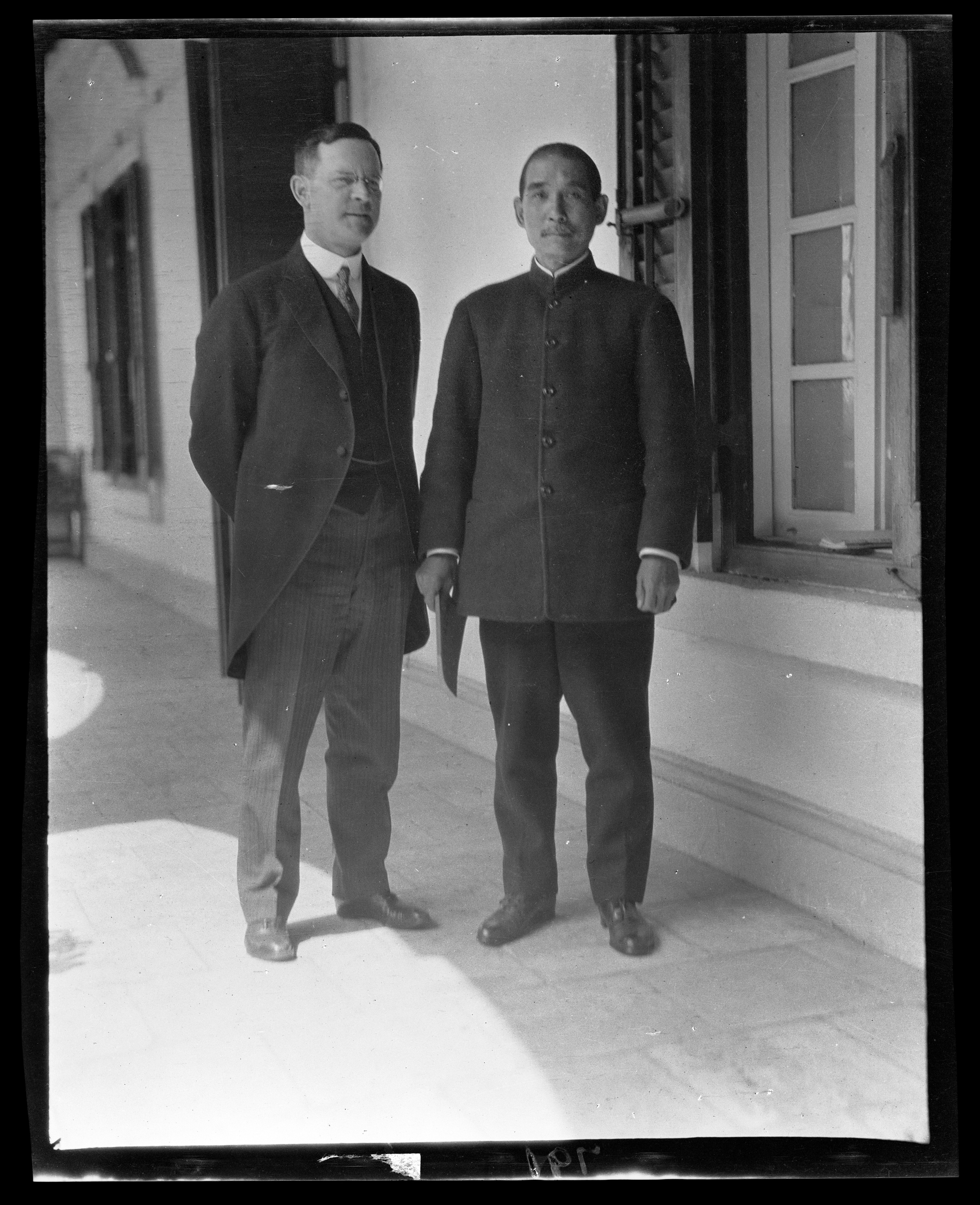
Sherwood Eddy & Sun Yat-Sen in Canton

Eddy had had a spiritual experience in 1889 at the Northfield conference. Therefore, after completing his engineering training he attended Union Theological Seminary (1891–1893) in New York. He also enlisted in the Student Volunteer Movement, which sought to "evangelize the world in this generation" and worked on the staff of a local Young Men's Christian Association (YMCA). In 1893-1894 he served as a traveling secretary for the Student Volunteer Movement in the United States. Eddy's father died in 1894, leaving him an inheritance that made him financially independent and enabled him to work for the causes he believed in without concern for finances. He then attended Princeton Theological Seminary, from which he graduated in 1896. In spite of his theology studies he always kept to his line to serve as a committed layman and a missionary.

Eddy was one of the first of sixteen thousand student volunteers who emerged from the leading universities of the U.S. and Europe to serve as Christian missionaries across the world as part of the Student Volunteer Movement. In 1896, he went to India and worked at the YMCA-organized Indian Student Volunteer Movement. He served as its secretary for the next 15 years. In 1897, Eddy took a ship from Madras to Calcutta where he met and debated Swami Vivekananda on Christianity and Hinduism. Whilst in India, Eddy attempted to convert Hindus to Christianity; in order not to offend the high caste Hindus, he converted to vegetarianism.

Working among the poor and outcasts of India, he mastered the Tamil language and served as a traveling evangelist among the students and masses of southern India beginning in Palamcottah. In 1911, he was appointed secretary for Asia by the International Committee of the YMCA, and he divided his time between evangelistic campaigns in Asia and fund-raising in North America. He spent the next 15 years doing student evangelistic work across Asia—from China, Japan, and the Philippines, through the Near East to Turkey, Palestine, Iraq, Egypt, and then to czarist Russia—and made 15 trips to the Soviet Russia. He admired the Soviet system and refused to believe reports of famine; in 1937, he agreed that the victims of Stalin's show trials were traitors as charged. His was criticized as a "fellow traveler."

From 1915 to 1917, he was itinerant secretary of the YMCAs with the British and American armed forces in France. In 1916, he received two honorary degrees, one from Wooster College and the other from Yale University. From 1921 to 1957, he conducted training courses for religious, political and business leaders in England and America; he addressed 1,500 American leaders. He is also known for his works with the Oxford Group evangelical group, a predecessor to Alcoholics Anonymous.

=== After the YMCA and end of life ===
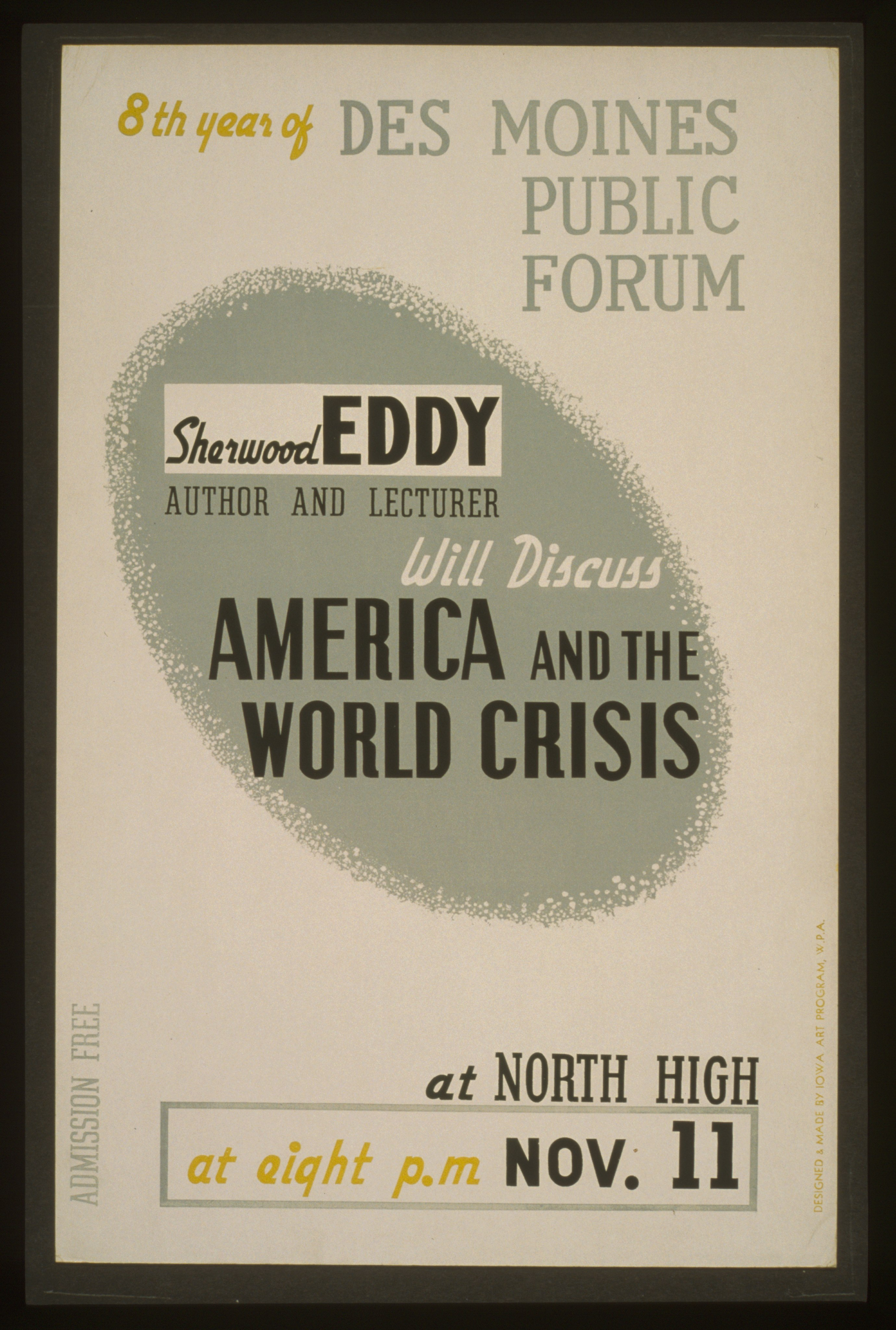
Poster announcing a public forum to be held in Des Moines, Iowa, at which Sherwood Eddy would speak to the theme "America and the world crisis" (between 1936 and 1940).

In 1931, Sherwood Eddy stopped his career with the YMCA where he had spent 35 years as a volunteer. He had become a member of the Fellowship of Socialist Christians which was organized in the early 1930s by Reinhold Niebuhr and others on the left. Later it changed its name to Frontier Fellowship and then to Christian Action. The main supporters of the Fellowship in the early days included Eddy, Eduard Heimann, Paul Tillich and Rose Terlin. In its early days the group thought capitalist individualism was incompatible with Christian ethics. Although not under Communist control, the group acknowledged Karl Marx's social philosophy.

In 1936, he founded and led with the Reverend Sam H. Franklin the Delta and Providence Cooperative Farms in Bolivar County, Mississippi, and Holmes County, Mississippi, in 1939, respectively. The farms helped southern sharecroppers out of their economic plight (caused in part by side effects of the New Deal's Agricultural Adjustment Administration). Eddy drew considerable support from his friend, the theologian Reinhold Niebuhr, who once called the farms "the most significant experiment in social Christianity now being conducted in America."

These cooperatives were organized around four principles: efficiency of production and finance through the cooperative principle, participation in the construction of an economy of socialized abundance, interracial justice and realistic religion as a social dynamic. Because of its principles of economic equality between races, the cooperative paid all its members equal pay for equal work. Activities included cotton growing, cattle breeding, a pasteurization plant and a sawmill. Co-operatives offered a range of services to their members and local communities, including a co-op store, a credit union, a medical clinic, educational programs, a library, religious services, and summer student camps. However, due to the tense political climate of the 1950s and declining cotton prices and sales volumes, the experiment concluded around 1956, and the land was sold to the cooperative's members.

In 1949, Sherwood Eddy moved to Jacksonville, Illinois, and taught at Illinois College and MacMurray College.

He died on November 4, 1963, in Jacksonville.

== Influence ==
In 1897, Sherwood Eddy experienced a personal and spiritual crisis that profoundly changed his vision of missionary work. He understood that his argumentative, apologetic approach could not be very successful because it created a defensive attitude among his listeners. He wrote, "we were not sent to win debates but to win people.” He understood that he had to address the ordinary people and, in 1900, he took almost two years off to learn Tamil; he understood that the local people and those who had come as missionaries had to be treated on a strictly equal footing. He was among the first to understand the aspirations of colonized peoples for self-determination and the need to appoint local leaders to lead local churches. In doing so, he anticipated by nearly 50 years, and initiated, the reflection that would lead the American Presbyterian Mission to thoroughly review its concepts, mainly after 1945.

In 1903, Sherwood Eddy founded with Anglican Bishop V.S. Azariah the first purely Indian Mission Society of Tinnevelly and in 1905 the National Missionary Society of India. Sherwood Eddy was the only non-Indian present at its founding conference in Serampore. Because of his perfect command of Tamil and his deep empathy for the Indians, he was considered one of them, which he described as one of the greatest compliments he ever received. Professor Rick Nutt considers that this initiative played a role in the emergence of Indian national sentiment. The NMS was also ecumenical as it brought together members from all Protestant churches in South India. It showed the way for churches that then also sought unity. In 1908 the South India United Church regrouped the Presbyterian and Congregationalist churches of South India, but efforts to integrate the Anglican faith into the union were unsuccessful until September 1947 when the Church of South India was created, bringing together the Anglican, Methodist, Congregationalist, Presbyterian and Reformed communities. Sherwood Eddy appears there as a pioneer of ecumenism between Protestant churches; although this had been the YMCA's policy since their inception, the merger of actual churches in India was one of the first achievements of this type ever.

From 1911 onwards, Sherwood Eddy and the YMCA missionaries led an effective evangelization in China based on the convictions and methods established in India. Missionary H. G. Lockwood noted in 1949 at a meeting with Chinese Christian leaders that the majority of them had been won to Christianity by Sherwood Eddy. Like Frank Buchman, Sherwood Eddy insisted on the need for missionaries to adopt exemplary moral behaviour.

== Personal life ==
Eddy was celibate all his life, he also eschewed all medical care and relied on his belief in the healing powers of God. Eddy stated that he had seen God working miraculously in response to prayer. For one year he did not use his glasses as he was convinced that God would correct his eyesight.

== Selected bibliography ==
- The Awakening of India (1911)
- The New Era in Asia (1913)
- The Students of Asia (1915)
- With Our Soldiers in France (1917)
- Everybody's World (1920)
- Eddy, Sherwood; Kirby Page (1924). The abolition of war. New York: George H. Doran.
- Eddy, Sherwood; Kirby Page (1926). Makers of freedom; biographical sketches in social progress. New York: George H. Doran Company. ISBN 978-0-8369-1803-8.
- What Shall I Believe in the Light of Psychology and the New Science (1926)
- The Challenge of Europe (1933). New York: Farrar & Rinehart
- A Pilgrimage of Ideas: Or, The Re-education of Sherwood Eddy (1934), Autobiography.
- Russia Today: What Can we Learn from It? (1934)
- Revolutionary Christianity (1934)
- Ten Suggestions for Personal work (1934)
- Pathfinders of the World Missionary Crusade. New York: Abingdon-Cokesbury Press. 1945.
- God in History (1947)
- You Will Survive After Death (1950)
- Eighty Adventurous Years: The Autobiography of Sherwood Eddy (1955)

He wrote other works which were published in England and India.

== See also ==
- History of religion in the United States
