= Algoma—Manitoulin (provincial electoral district) =

Provincial electoral district in Ontario, Canada

Coordinates: 48.038°N 83.807°W

Ontario electoral district
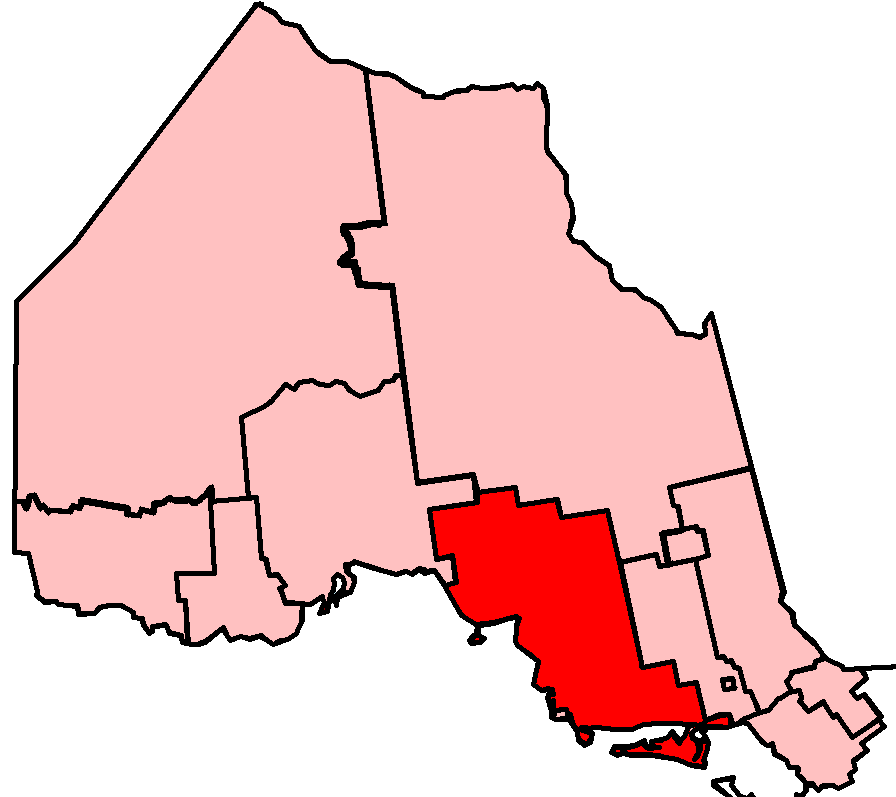
- Algoma—Manitoulin in relation to other northern Ontario electoral districts

Provincial electoral district
- Legislature: Legislative Assembly of Ontario
MPP
Bill Rosenberg
Progressive Conservative
- First contested: 1934
- Last contested: 2025

Demographics
- Population (2016): 68,480
- Electors (2018): 55,544
- Area (km²): 109,575
- Pop. density (per km²): 0.62
- Census division(s): Algoma, Manitoulin, Sudbury, Thunder Bay
- Census subdivision(s): Blind River, Elliot Lake, Espanola, Wawa

Algoma—Manitoulin is a provincial electoral district in Ontario, Canada, that has been represented in the Legislative Assembly of Ontario since 1934.

Between 1986 and 1999, the district consisted of all of Algoma District minus two townships south of Hearst, an area of the southeast, which included Elliot Lake and everything east of it, and the city of Sault Ste. Marie.

In 1996, Ontario was divided into the same electoral districts as those used for federal electoral purposes. They were redistributed whenever a readjustment took place at the federal level.

In 2005, legislation was passed by the Legislature to divide Ontario into 107 electoral districts, beginning with the next provincial election in 2007. The eleven northern electoral districts, including Algoma—Manitoulin, are those defined for federal purposes in 1996, based on the 1991 census (except for a minor boundary adjustment). The 96 southern electoral districts are those defined for federal electoral purposes in 2003, based on the 2001 census. Without this legislation, the number of electoral districts in northern Ontario would have been reduced from eleven to ten.

== Members of Provincial Parliament ==
This riding has elected the following members of the Legislative Assembly of Ontario:

Algoma—Manitoulin
Assembly	Years	Member	Party
Riding created
19th	1934–1937	Wilfred Miller	Liberal
20th	1937–1943	Wilfred Miller	Liberal
21st	1943–1945	Wilfred Miller	Liberal
22nd	1945–1948	John Fullerton	Progressive Conservative
23rd	1948–1951	John Fullerton	Progressive Conservative
24th	1951–1955	John Fullerton	Progressive Conservative
25th	1955–1959	John Fullerton	Progressive Conservative
26th	1959–1963	John Fullerton	Progressive Conservative
27th	1963–1967	Stanley Farquhar	Liberal
28th	1967–1971	Stanley Farquhar	Liberal
29th	1971–1975	John Lane	Progressive Conservative
30th	1975–1977	John Lane	Progressive Conservative
31st	1977–1981	John Lane	Progressive Conservative
32nd	1981–1985	John Lane	Progressive Conservative
33rd	1985–1987	John Lane	Progressive Conservative
34th	1987–1990	Michael A. Brown	Liberal
35th	1990–1995	Michael A. Brown	Liberal
36th	1995–1999	Michael A. Brown	Liberal
37th	1999–2003	Michael A. Brown	Liberal
38th	2003–2007	Michael A. Brown	Liberal
39th	2007–2011	Michael A. Brown	Liberal
40th	2011–2014	Michael Mantha	New Democratic
41st	2014–2018	Michael Mantha	New Democratic
42nd	2018–2022	Michael Mantha	New Democratic
43rd	2022–2023	Michael Mantha	New Democratic
43rd	2023–2025	Michael Mantha	Independent
44th	2025–present	Bill Rosenberg	Progressive Conservative

== Election results ==
Winning party in each polling division of Algoma—Manitoulin at the 2025 Ontario general election

2025 Ontario general election
Party	Candidate	Votes	%	±%	Expenditures
Progressive Conservative	Bill Rosenberg	11,263	41.33	+5.85	$69,335
New Democratic	David Timeriski	7,409	27.19	–18.74	$38,229
Liberal	Reg Niganobe	3,948	14.49	+5.78	$10,822
Independent	Michael Mantha	3,238	11.88	–34.05	$22,791
New Blue	Sheldon Pressey	718	2.63	–2.68	$224
Green	Maria Legault	677	2.48	–0.63	$40
Total valid votes/expense limit		27,253	99.08	–	$102,206
Total rejected, unmarked and declined ballots		253	0.92	+0.25	
Turnout		27,506	48.93	+6.46	
Eligible voters		56,213			
Progressive Conservative gain from New Democratic		Swing		+12.30	
Source: Elections Ontario

Winning party in each polling division of Algoma—Manitoulin at the 2022 Ontario general election

2022 Ontario general election
Party	Candidate	Votes	%	±%	Expenditures
New Democratic	Michael Mantha	11,252	45.93	–12.63	$56,480
Progressive Conservative	Cheryl Fort	8,692	35.48	+11.03	$39,185
Liberal	Tim Vine	2,133	8.71	+0.61	$28,774
New Blue	Ron Koski	1,302	5.31	–	$1,144
Green	Maria Legault	764	3.12	–0.39	$381
Ontario Party	Frederick Weening	356	1.45	–	$0
Total valid votes/expense limit		24,499	99.34	+0.26	$91,463
Total rejected, unmarked and declined ballots		164	0.67	–0.25	
Turnout		24,663	42.47	–10.61	
Eligible voters		58,076			
New Democratic hold		Swing		–11.83	
Source: Elections Ontario

2018 Ontario general election
Party	Candidate	Votes	%	±%	Expenditures
New Democratic	Michael Mantha	17,105	58.56	+5.15	$71,665
Progressive Conservative	Jib Turner	7,143	24.45	+7.16	$32,275
Liberal	Charles Fox	2,365	8.10	–16.42	$28,755
Northern Ontario Heritage	Tommy Lee	1,366	4.68	–	$0
Green	Justin Tilson	1,025	3.51	+0.39	$208
Libertarian	Kalena Mallon-Ferguson	207	0.71	–0.95	none listed
Total valid votes		29,211	99.08		
Total rejected, unmarked and declined ballots		270	0.92	–0.30	
Turnout		29,481	53.08	+3.70	
Eligible voters		55,544			
New Democratic hold		Swing		–1.22	
Source: Elections Ontario

2014 Ontario general election
Party	Candidate	Votes	%	±%
New Democratic	Michael Mantha	14,171	53.41	+8.89
Liberal	Craig Hughson	6,504	24.51	–3.91
Progressive Conservative	Jib Turner	4,589	17.30	–6.30
Green	Alexandra Zalucky	828	3.12	+0.49
Libertarian	Richard Hadidian	441	1.66	–
Total valid votes		26,533	98.78	
Total rejected, unmarked and declined ballots		327	1.22	+0.71
Turnout		26,860	49.38	–0.05
Eligible voters		54,395		
New Democratic hold		Swing		+6.40
Source: Elections Ontario

2011 Ontario general election
Party	Candidate	Votes	%	±%
New Democratic	Michael Mantha	11,585	44.52	+7.57
Liberal	Michael A. Brown	7,397	28.42	–14.13
Progressive Conservative	Joe Chapman	6,141	23.60	+9.57
Green	Justin Tilson	684	2.63	–2.52
Family Coalition	David Hoffman	217	0.83	–0.49
Total valid votes		26,024	99.49	
Total rejected, unmarked and declined ballots		134	0.51	–0.15
Turnout		26,158	49.43	–5.06
Eligible voters		52,919		
New Democratic gain from Liberal		Swing		+10.85
Source: Elections Ontario

2007 Ontario general election
Party	Candidate	Votes	%	±%
Liberal	Michael A. Brown	11,361	42.56	–6.12
New Democratic	Peter Denley	9,863	36.95	+5.23
Progressive Conservative	Ron Swain	3,744	14.02	–3.30
Green	Ron Yurick	1,374	5.15	+2.87
Family Coalition	Ray Scott	354	1.33	–
Total valid votes		26,696	99.34	
Total rejected, unmarked and declined ballots		177	0.66	–0.10
Turnout		26,873	54.49	–3.34
Eligible voters		49,314		
Liberal hold		Swing		–5.68
Source: Elections Ontario

2003 Ontario general election
Party	Candidate	Votes	%	±%
Liberal	Michael A. Brown	14,520	48.68	+4.16
New Democratic	Peter Denley	9,459	31.71	+4.38
Progressive Conservative	Terry McCutcheon	5,168	17.33	–9.50
Green	Ron Yurick	680	2.28	–
Total valid votes		29,827	99.24	
Total rejected, unmarked and declined ballots		227	0.76	+0.10
Turnout		30,054	57.83	–0.15
Eligible voters		51,970		
Liberal hold		Swing		–0.11
Source: Elections Ontario

1999 Ontario general election
Party	Candidate	Votes	%	±%
Liberal	Michael A. Brown	14,299	44.52	–2.44
New Democratic	Lynn Watson	8,780	27.33	+7.93
Progressive Conservative	Keith Currie	8,617	26.83	–6.81
Libertarian	Graham Hearn	425	1.32	–
Total valid votes		32,121	99.34	
Total rejected, unmarked and declined ballots		213	0.66	+0.08
Turnout		32,334	57.98	–1.35
Eligible voters		55,770		
Liberal hold		Swing		–5.19
Source: Elections Ontario

1995 Ontario general election
Party	Candidate	Votes	%	±%
Liberal	Michael A. Brown	7,238	46.96	+8.10
Progressive Conservative	Joyce Foster	5,184	33.63	+19.53
New Democratic	Lois E. Miller	2,991	19.41	–18.11
Total valid votes		15,413	99.43	
Total rejected, unmarked and declined ballots		89	0.57	–0.14
Turnout		15,502	59.33	–1.92
Eligible voters		26,128		
Liberal hold		Swing		–5.72
Source: Elections Ontario

1990 Ontario general election
Party	Candidate	Votes	%	±%
Liberal	Michael A. Brown	5,961	38.86	–7.19
New Democratic	Lois E. Miller	5,754	37.51	+9.30
Progressive Conservative	Ken Ferguson	2,163	14.10	–11.63
Confederation of Regions	Richard Hammond	1,114	7.26	–
Independent	Eugene Solomon	347	2.26	–
Total valid votes		15,339	99.29	
Total rejected, unmarked and declined ballots		110	0.71	+0.28
Turnout		15,449	61.25	–0.86
Eligible voters		25,221		
Liberal hold		Swing		–8.24
Source: Elections Ontario

1987 Ontario general election
Party	Candidate	Votes	%	±%
Liberal	Michael A. Brown	7,157	46.05	+15.08
New Democratic	Ron Boucher	4,385	28.22	+6.43
Progressive Conservative	Ben Wilson	3,999	25.73	–21.51
Total valid votes		15,541	99.56	
Total rejected ballots		68	0.44	–0.17
Turnout		15,609	62.11	+6.66
Eligible voters		25,130		
Liberal gain from Progressive Conservative		Swing		+10.75
Source: Elections Ontario

1985 Ontario general election
Party	Candidate	Votes	%	±%
Progressive Conservative	John Gordon Lane	7,174	47.24	–10.12
Liberal	Tom Farquhar	4,704	30.97	+7.05
New Democratic	Len Hembruff	3,309	21.79	+3.07
Total valid votes		15,187	99.39	
Total rejected ballots		93	0.61	+0.28
Turnout		15,280	55.45	+5.33
Eligible voters		27,556		
Progressive Conservative hold		Swing		–8.59
Source: Elections Ontario

1981 Ontario general election
Party	Candidate	Votes	%	±%
Progressive Conservative	John Gordon Lane	7,160	57.36	+0.73
Liberal	Ernest E. Massicotte	2,986	23.92	+7.31
New Democratic	Peter Boychuk	2,336	18.71	–8.03
Total valid votes		12,482	99.67	
Total rejected ballots		41	0.33	–0.04
Turnout		12,523	50.12	–14.59
Eligible voters		24,986		
Progressive Conservative hold		Swing		–3.29
Source: Elections Ontario

1977 Ontario general election
Party	Candidate	Votes	%	±%
Progressive Conservative	John Gordon Lane	7,381	56.64	+15.85
New Democratic	Don Prescott	3,486	26.75	–5.61
Liberal	Tasso Christie	2,165	16.61	–10.24
Total valid votes		13,032	99.63	
Total rejected ballots		48	0.37	–0.12
Turnout		13,080	64.71	–7.53
Eligible voters		20,212		
Progressive Conservative hold		Swing		+10.73
Source: Elections Ontario

1975 Ontario general election
Party	Candidate	Votes	%	±%
Progressive Conservative	John Gordon Lane	5,452	40.79	+0.47
New Democratic	Winston Baker	4,325	32.36	+2.20
Liberal	Leo A. Foucault	3,589	26.85	–2.67
Total valid votes		13,366	99.51	
Total rejected ballots		66	0.49	–0.71
Turnout		13,432	72.24	+0.18
Eligible voters		18,593		
Progressive Conservative hold		Swing		–0.87
Source: Elections Ontario

1971 Ontario general election
Party	Candidate	Votes	%	±%
Progressive Conservative	John Gordon Lane	5,147	40.32	+9.50
New Democratic	Roger Taylor	3,849	30.16	+6.10
Liberal	Austin H. Hunt	3,768	29.52	–15.60
Total valid votes		12,764	98.80	
Total rejected ballots		155	1.20	+0.33
Turnout		12,919	72.06	+4.45
Eligible voters		17,927		
Progressive Conservative gain from Liberal		Swing		+7.80
Source: Elections Ontario

1967 Ontario general election
Party	Candidate	Votes	%	±%
Liberal	Stan Farquhar	4,424	45.12	–4.77
Progressive Conservative	Charles Stewart	3,022	30.82	–9.52
New Democratic	Len Lefebvre	2,358	24.05	+14.28
Total valid votes		9,804	99.13	
Total rejected ballots		86	0.87	+0.12
Turnout		9,890	67.62	+1.37
Eligible voters		14,626		
Liberal hold		Swing		+7.14
Source: Elections Ontario

1963 Ontario general election
Party	Candidate	Votes	%	±%
Liberal	Stan Farquhar	7,951	49.89	+14.04
Progressive Conservative	John Fullerton	6,429	40.34	–0.85
New Democratic	Arley Spencer	1,557	9.77	–13.19
Total valid votes		15,937	99.25	
Total rejected ballots		120	0.75	–0.69
Turnout		16,057	66.25	+3.50
Eligible voters		24,238		
Liberal gain from Progressive Conservative		Swing		+7.45
Source: Elections Ontario

1959 Ontario general election
Party	Candidate	Votes	%	±%
Progressive Conservative	John Fullerton	8,054	41.19	–3.18
Liberal	Clarence Eaket	7,009	35.85	–1.55
Co-operative Commonwealth	Richard Hunter	4,488	22.96	+4.73
Total valid votes		19,551	98.56	
Total rejected ballots		285	1.44	+1.44
Turnout		19,836	62.75	–6.79
Eligible voters		31,611		
Progressive Conservative hold		Swing		–2.36
Source: Elections Ontario

1955 Ontario general election
Party	Candidate	Votes	%	±%
Progressive Conservative	John Fullerton	5,725	44.37	–2.81
Liberal	Clarence Eaket	4,825	37.40	–0.39
Co-operative Commonwealth	George Thornton	2,352	18.23	+3.20
Total valid votes		12,902	100.00	
Total rejected ballots		–		
Turnout		12,902	69.54	+0.43
Eligible voters		18,554		
Progressive Conservative hold		Swing		–1.60
Source: Elections Ontario

1951 Ontario general election
Party	Candidate	Votes	%	±%
Progressive Conservative	John Fullerton	5,718	47.18	+9.25
Liberal	Thomas W. Farquhar	4,580	37.79	+5.66
Co-operative Commonwealth	Lorne D. Callahan	1,822	15.03	–14.91
Total valid votes		12,120	99.48	
Total rejected ballots		63	0.52	–0.36
Turnout		12,183	69.11	–5.78
Eligible voters		17,629		
Progressive Conservative hold		Swing		+7.45
Source: Elections Ontario

1948 Ontario general election
Party	Candidate	Votes	%	±%
Progressive Conservative	John Fullerton	4,907	37.93	+0.51
Liberal	Alma J. Wagg	4,156	32.13	–3.84
Co-operative Commonwealth	Lorne D. Callahan	3,873	29.94	+3.33
Total valid votes		12,936	99.12	
Total rejected ballots		115	0.88	+0.14
Turnout		13,051	74.89	–1.81
Eligible voters		17,427		
Progressive Conservative hold		Swing		+2.18
Source: Elections Ontario

1945 Ontario general election
Party	Candidate	Votes	%	±%
Progressive Conservative	John Fullerton	4,336	37.42	+7.91
Liberal	James F. McDermid	4,168	35.97	–3.06
Co-operative Commonwealth	Clifford R. Bradley	3,083	26.61	–4.85
Total valid votes		11,587	99.26	
Total rejected ballots		86	0.74	+0.09
Turnout		11,673	76.70	+13.84
Eligible voters		15,220		
Progressive Conservative gain from Liberal		Swing		+5.49
Source: Elections Ontario

1943 Ontario general election
Party	Candidate	Votes	%	±%
Liberal	Wilfred Lynn Miller	3,755	39.03	–11.91
Co-operative Commonwealth	Albert Edward Headrick	3,026	31.46	–
Progressive Conservative	Roy Edward Cumming	2,839	29.51	–17.30
Total valid votes		9,620	99.35	
Total rejected ballots		63	0.65	–0.48
Turnout		9,683	62.85	–11.76
Eligible voters		15,406		
Liberal hold		Swing		–5.96
Source: Elections Ontario

1937 Ontario general election
Party	Candidate	Votes	%	±%
Liberal	Wilfred Lynn Miller	7,092	50.94	–11.93
Conservative	John Morrow Robb	6,516	46.81	+9.68
Farm-Labour	Theo Nadeau	313	2.25	–
Total valid votes		13,921	98.87	
Total rejected ballots		159	1.13	+0.12
Turnout		14,080	74.61	–4.46
Eligible voters		18,871		
Liberal hold		Swing		–10.80
Source: Elections Ontario

1934 Ontario general election
Party	Candidate	Votes	%	±%
Liberal	Wilfred Lynn Miller	9,247	62.87	–
Conservative	John Morrow Robb	5,461	37.13	–
Total valid votes		14,708	98.99	
Total rejected ballots		150	1.01	–
Turnout		14,858	79.07	–
Eligible voters		18,791		
Source: Elections Ontario

== 2007 electoral reform referendum ==
2007 Ontario electoral reform referendum
Side	Votes	%
First Past the Post	18,097	69.9
Mixed member proportional	7,794	30.1
Total valid votes	25,891	100.0

== See also ==
- List of Ontario provincial electoral districts
- Canadian provincial electoral districts

== Sources ==
- Elections Ontario Results
- Elections Ontario Past Election Results
  - 1999 results
  - 2003 results
  - 2007 results
- 2018 Riding map from Elections Ontario
