= Queen's University Faculty of Education =

Faculty of Queen's University in Canada

Coordinates: 44°13′26.9″N 76°30′50.8″W

- Type: Public education school
- Established: 1907; 119 years ago
- Parent institution: Queen's University at Kingston
- Dean: Rebecca Luce-Kapler
- Academic staff: 117
- Location: Kingston, Ontario, Canada
- Website: educ.queensu.ca

The Queen's University Faculty of Education at Queen's University at Kingston in Canada was founded in 1907. Over 23,000 teachers and education professionals have graduated from the Faculty since 1907. The Faculty is located at Duncan McArthur Hall, an integrated educational complex that provides teaching and learning facilities, support services, and administrative offices under one roof on West Campus.

== History ==
Duncan McArthur Hall, location of Queen's Faculty of Education.

Queen's first Faculty of Education was founded in 1907, but it was closed in 1920 when the training of teachers in Ontario was centralized in Toronto. The present Faculty dates from 1965, when the province approved the established of the McArthur College of Education, a Queen's-affiliated college temporarily located at 131 Union Street (now the site of Stauffer Library).

Named after Duncan McArthur, the former head of Queen's History Department who became Ontario's Minister of Education, the College registered its first 40 students in the 1968-1969 academic year under the deanship of Queen's alumnus Vernon Ready.

By 1971, the college was renamed the Faculty of Education to clarify its relationship to Queen's and moved to its present home in Duncan McArthur Hall on West Campus.

== Programs ==
=== Bachelor's programs ===
Programs

Concurrent Education: One Program, Two bachelor's degrees at the same time. A five-year + 1 summer term program for secondary school graduates. In years 1-4, students complete Education courses and in-school placements concurrently with courses in their four-year undergraduate degree. The entire fifth year of study is spent completing the Bachelor of Education in three successive terms, from September to August. Most other faculties of education offer their program in six years, with typical fall and winter semesters.

Consecutive Education: A second bachelor's degree. The new successive term program for university graduates starts in May and ends in August of the following year. Most other faculties of education will offer their program over two years, with typical fall and winter semesters.

Concentrations

Concentrations are offered to both Primary-Junior and Intermediate-Senior teacher candidates (Concurrent Education students complete concentration courses in their final year).

By combining a Focus course, an Educational Studies course, and the Alternative Practicum, teacher candidates can tailor their program to their interests and form a concentration in areas such as:

- Teaching in Business and Industry
- Teaching At-Risk Youth
- Educators Abroad
- Exceptional Learners
- Aboriginal Teacher Education
- Artist in Community Education
- Outdoor and Experiential Education
- Technological Education

=== Diploma in Education programs ===
The Diploma in Education is for those with a secondary school diploma. Similar to the Bachelor’s program with the exception of the admission requirements, the Diploma in Education prepares candidates for teacher certification only in the following concentrations.

- Aboriginal Teacher Education Community-Based Program: a part-time program (Primary-Junior only) based in communities in Ontario; for teacher candidates who have a secondary school diploma and are of Aboriginal ancestry to specialize in Junior-Kindergarten to Grade 6.
- Technological Education: for teacher candidates with five years of experience in the broad-based technology (or a suitable combination of education and experience) and a secondary school diploma.

=== Graduate programs ===
Programs are administered by the Queen's School of Graduate Studies. Major fields of study include curriculum studies, cognitive studies and cultural and policy studies. Both master's and doctoral programs are available.

- The Master of Education is for those with a bachelor's degree and an interest in research in the field of education. It is a part-time or full-time program designed to develop the leadership abilities that emerge from graduate study, including critical reflection, research and writing.
- The Master of Education in Aboriginal and World Indigenous Educational Studies is for those with a bachelor's degree and an interest in research in the field of Aboriginal education. It is a part-time blended (on-campus and online) program intended for students with experience in Aboriginal communities and/or in Aboriginal and world indigenous issues. Courses are on-campus during the first summer of the program, and the balance is completed online.
- The Doctor of Philosophy in Education is for students who have successfully completed a master's degree with first class standing. It is a full-time, 4-year, on-campus program with three terms per year.

=== Online graduate programs ===
The Graduate Diploma and Professional Master of Education are accredited part-time programs designed for current teachers and education professionals who wish to improve their professional practice and/or take their careers to the next level. These programs will help improve inquiry, decision-making, team and leadership skills.

- The Graduate Diploma in Professional Inquiry consists of 5 online courses (3 required courses and 2 elective courses).
- The Professional Master of Education consists of 5 graduate diploma courses and 5 professional master's courses (3 courses in a concentration, a course in organizational leadership and an elective).

To accommodate work schedules, the courses are 7 weeks in summer and 10 weeks in fall and winter.

There are two options: students can enroll in the graduate diploma program & then decide whether to apply to the professional master's or they can enroll directly in the professional master's degree program.

=== Additional qualification and professional development courses ===
Additional qualification and professional development courses for teachers provide opportunities for career advancement in education.
