= John Morrow Robb =

Canadian politician

Ontario MPP
- In office 1926–1934
- Preceded by: Arthur Gladstone Wallis
- Succeeded by: Riding abolished
- In office 1915–1919
- Preceded by: Albert Grigg
- Succeeded by: Kenneth Spencer Stover
- Constituency: Algoma

Personal details
- Born: July 4, 1876 Downie Township, Perth County
- Died: December 11, 1942 (aged 66) Blind River, Ontario
- Party: Conservative

John Morrow Robb (July 4, 1876 – December 11, 1942) was a physician and political figure in Ontario. He represented Algoma in the Legislative Assembly of Ontario from 1916 to 1919 and from 1926 to 1934 as a Conservative member.

== Background ==
The son of Samuel Robb and Margaret Morrow, he was born in Downie Township, Perth County. Robb was educated in Stratford and at the University of Toronto. He taught school for three years in Middlesex County. In 1909, Robb married Olive R. Kidd. He served on the school board for Blind River and was Medical Officer of Health for over 20 years.

== Politics ==
Robb was defeated when he ran for reelection to the assembly in 1919 and 1923. He served as Minister of Health from 1930 to 1934 and as Ministry of Labour in 1934. He built a hospital in Blind River which he turned over to the Canadian Red Cross after he was named Minister of Health. Robb died in Blind River at the age of 65.

=== Cabinet positions ===
Henry ministry, Province of Ontario (1930–1934)
Cabinet posts (2)
Predecessor	Office	Successor
Joseph Monteith	Minister of Labour; 1934 (January–July)	Mitchell Hepburn
Forbes Godfrey	Minister of Health; 1930-1934	James Albert Faulkner
