= Tom Angus (entomologist) =

Canadian entomologist and politician (1915–2005)

Sault Ste. Marie Alderman
- In office January 1, 1960 – December 2, 1991
- Preceded by: James L. McIntyre
- Succeeded by: Jack Cameletti
- Constituency: Ward One (1960–1981); Ward Two (1981–1991)

Personal details
- Born: Thomas Anderson Angus; September 19, 1915 Toronto, Ontario, Canada
- Died: June 16, 2005 (aged 89) London, Ontario, Canada
- Spouse: Jane Smith (m. 1950)
- Children: 3
- Education: Ontario Agricultural College; University of Toronto; McGill University

Thomas Anderson Angus (September 19, 1915 – June 16, 2005) was a Canadian entomologist and politician. He was the longest continuously serving member of Sault Ste. Marie City Council, for 31 consecutive years from 1960 to 1991. He served four terms as the chair of the Algoma Health Unit and served on the boards of governors of both Algoma University and Sault College, and was a director for the Federation of Canadian Municipalities. As a research scientist, he was credited with discovering a toxin-producing bacteria that led to the use of Bacillus thuringiensis as a pest control in forestry and agriculture.

== Background ==
Angus was born in Toronto on September 19, 1915, to David H. Angus and Elizabeth Anderson Angus, Scottish immigrants living in the city's Parkdale neighbourhood.

After completing high school he worked in a men's clothing store.

He enlisted in the Royal Canadian Air Force during the Second World War. Stationed in England, he served as a bombardier navigator from 1942 to 1945, completing two tours and 55 missions. He was awarded the Distinguished Flying Cross in 1943 with the citation:

Pilot Officer Angus has played a most important part as bomb aimer in a very successful crew. He has always shown the utmost coolness in directing his aircraft to concentrations of anti-aircraft fire and in bombing the objective accurately in the face of opposition. This officer is an exceptionally intelligent and able bomb aimer who has set a fine example in operations over many highly fortified targets.

In 1945, he was awarded the bar to the Distinguished Flying Cross with the citation:

Since the award of the Distinguished Flying Cross Flight Lieutenant Angus has completed a second tour of operational duties during which he has participated in attacks against such heavily defended targets as Duisburg, Dortmund, Essen and Nuremburg. As bombing leader his cheerful courage, determination and efficiency both in the air and on the ground have set a magnificent example to all.

== Research scientist ==
Following the war, on his mother's suggestion, and with a $90 month stipend offered to veterans, Angus enrolled at the Ontario Agricultural College in Guelph where he earned a Bachelor of Science degree in biology in 1949.

A year later he received a master's degree from the University of Toronto followed by a PhD in microbiology from McGill University in 1952. While completing his bachelor's degree, Tom began to work summers as a student assistant at the federal Forest Insect Laboratory in Sault Ste. Marie. After graduation in 1952 he was hired as a research officer at the laboratory, which became the Insect Pathology Research Institute (IPRI).

Angus conducted leading research into Bacillus thuringiensis, a rod shaped bacteria found in soils and the effect it has on caterpillars and similar insects. His work led to the organism being used as an environmentally safe microbial insecticide for a wide range of insect pests. Angus authored or contributed to over forty research papers and book chapters, most on this subject.

In 1967, Angus was instrumental in the creation of the Society for Insect Pathology, eventually serving as its president.

In 1970, Angus was appointed as associate director of the IPRI. In 1977 he was named the deputy director of the Forest Pest Management Institute, a reorganization of the IPRI and another research institute. Having reached mandatory retirement at the age of 65, he retired from that role and the federal public service in the fall of 1980.

As a writer and scientist, Angus was often called upon by colleagues to review and edit their papers. Similarly, his oration skills and sense of humor made him a desired speaker on insect pathology at scientific events and conferences.

== Municipal politics ==
For over three decades and through the terms of seven mayors, Angus was also a popular alderman on Sault Ste. Marie's city council. With 31 years of uninterrupted service, he is the longest continuously serving council member in the city's history.

Angus credited his involvement in city affairs to his supervisor at IPRI, Dr. J. M. Cameron, who promoted good citizenship as a virtue among his staff. Before running for council, Angus served as a citizen member of the city's planning board as well as vice chairman of the parking advisory committee.

Angus first sought election in the 1959, running in the city's east end Ward One where both seats were vacated by aldermen running for mayor. In this race Angus established himself as an early critic of Ontario's property tax system and the need for cities to have alternative revenue sources in order to meet their responsibilities.

Angus was elected with 1,798 votes, the largest vote total of any alderman in the city, a feat he would often repeat in future elections.

In 1978, a redrawing of the city's ward boundaries put his residence in the more central Ward Two. Undeterred, Angus undertook what he called “my biggest campaign yet”, canvassing extensively and spending $900 of his own money to promote his candidacy in his new ward. In the end, Angus had an easy win, topping the ward with 3,848 votes - the largest total vote of any alderman in the city. He would continue to serve Ward Two for the remainder of his time in office.

Between 1959 and 1988, Angus was elected, re-elected or acclaimed 15 times. He ran unopposed only once, in 1970 when he and one other candidate were acclaimed in Ward One.

His long service and reputation for fairness on council resulted in Angus being often named acting mayor during the sitting mayor's absence from meetings.

Angus admitted to have been approached several times to run for the mayor's job over the years but declined so he could focus on his career as a public servant and scientist. “I had one of those jobs that was challenging. It was what I wanted to do. I didn’t want to do anything else.”

Asked how an accomplished research scientist found his way onto a city council for over 30 years, Angus was reported to have said “Some guys golf, some guys fish, I just dabbled around in politics.”

=== Issues ===
Angus spoke against intolerance and bigotry. In what he called a “highly personal speech” to launch the city's Legion Week in 1978, Angus called on his audience to take active steps to promote understanding. “Personal commitment means actively opposing bigotry, intolerance, malice and mean-mouthing wherever you find it, in high places or low […] So I would ask you to examine your own attitudes and ask yourselves this simple question: how would I feel in his shoes or predicament? Are you prepared to walk a mile, or even 50 feet [in another person’s shoes]?”

Angus was a passionate advocate for education and described public schools as “temples of the future.” He rejected a plan to cut education budgets saying “a poor bargain in teachers and a poor bargain in schools is the worst kind of bargain.”

Though the issue was defeated in a referendum two years earlier, Angus pushed for another vote to add fluoride to the city's drinking water in 1970. He faced opposition on council, but argued “the voters have been given time to change their minds and it is the council’s duty to lead.” The fluoridization referendum was again defeated in that year's election.

In 1972, Angus supported a controversial proposal to increase the honourarium paid to aldermen arguing that it “should be such that people of all walks of life can afford to run, not just the wealthy or well paid.”

As he did in the case of the honorarium, Angus showed concern that people of modest incomes not become priced out of political participation, arguing “If you can’t afford to lose $1,000, you shouldn’t get into (a campaign) and that’s unfortunate. In order to get your name before the public these days, you’re driven to these expensive advertising campaigns.”

Angus favoured a short-lived proposal to change the city's ward system to elect an equal number of ward and at-large councillors believing that such a council would be more attuned to city-wide concerns instead of ward-specific needs.

He also favoured measures to increase transparency in election donations, saying “I think it’s going to be a substantial contribution. I think it will help to keep the game tidy. I think it’s healthy for democracy for people to know who’s helping who get elected.”

Angus often found himself urging fellow councillors to focus on municipal matters they were entrusted with, and leaving other matters to the other orders of government. In one example, he argued against a council motion urging the Senate to vote down the proposed federal goods and services tax in 1990.

Deriding it as "an unnecessary resolution that solves a problem that does not exist," Angus was one of only two city councillors to vote against the controversial Sault Ste. Marie language resolution in 1990. Angus later observed that the issue “generated a whole lot of heat and emotion, but it wasn’t that directly important to Sault Ste. Marie. [However, it did] earn us a reputation we don’t deserve.”

In November 1991, in one of his last votes, Angus voted to recommend that the title "alderman" be replaced with "councillor." Three years earlier, describing himself as "old fashioned" and "a traditionalist" Angus had voted with the majority against such a change.

=== Leaving politics ===
Saying “I think there comes a time when you should wander off the stage gracefully,” and citing a desire to slow down and enjoy time with friends, family and other pursuits, in September 1991 Angus announced that he would not seek re-election in that November's municipal election.

Calling him “one of Sault Ste. Marie’s finest political figures,” a Sault Star editorial at the time lauded his style as a representative, saying “He injected a measure of reason and sanity and intellect into council debates that few aldermen past or present have been able to.”

== Honours ==
In 1992, Algoma University awarded Angus an honorary doctorate in science.

In 1996, the international Society for Invertebrate Pathology, which he had helped found, named him an honorary member for life for his contributions to the field.

In 1997, he and Dr. Arthur Heimpel with whom he collaborated on the original research into Bacillus thuriengensis were honoured with a lecture by the Society for Invertebrate Pathology.

In February 2001, the city council presented Angus with a service award in recognition of his decades of service to the city.

== Family and personal life ==
Angus met Jane Smith when both were enrolled at Ontario Agricultural College. The two were married in 1950. Like her husband, Jane Angus was also very active in the community, including serving 28 years with the local branch of the Canadian Red Cross and receiving the city's Medal of Merit in 1978. She died in Sault Ste. Marie on April 30, 1992.

The couple had two daughters, Elizabeth and Jeanie. A son John David died in 1961.

Angus made a habit of swimming at least three times a week and was active in recreational team sports as a long time member of the YMCA's noon volleyball league.

== Death and tributes ==
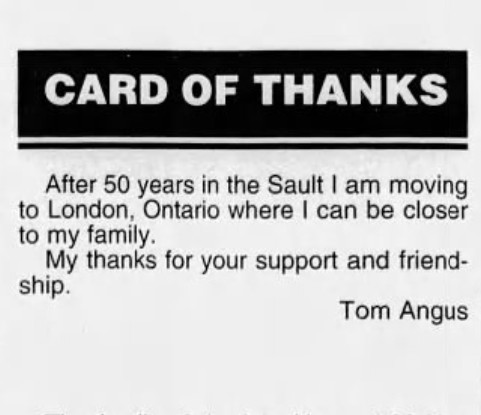
Tom Angus' thank you announcement in Sault Star, Oct 27, 2001

As his heath began to fail, Angus moved from Sault Ste. Marie to London, Ontario, to be closer to his daughters. He died there, at Parkwood Hospital, on June 16, 2005, at age 89.

Former alderman and mayor Joe Fratesi lauded his skills as a city councillor, saying “the qualities he brought to the table, in my opinion, made him one of the finest municipal representatives this community has ever had … He had a knack for bringing about consensus on contentious issues that were splitting council – thinking it through, then bringing something to the table that everyone could buy into.”

Former city councillor and mayor Steve Butland called him “a respected statesman extraordinaire who, in my opinion, was instrumental in the development of Sault Ste. Marie.” About his change of wards in 1980, he said Angus was “never missing a beat – he was as popular in Ward Two as he had been in Ward One.”

A colleague at the forestry institute, George Green wrote that “Tom will long be remembered by all who knew him, not only for his accomplishments and his contributions […] but also for his passion for life, his endless humour, his helpfulness in so many ways and his true friendship over the years. We, who were his colleagues, will miss him greatly.”

== Electoral record ==
Between 1959 and 1988, Angus was elected, re-elected or acclaimed 15 times – eleven times in Ward One and four times in Ward Two. His only acclimation occurred in the 1970 election in Ward One.

During the time he was on council, Sault Ste. Marie aldermen were elected on a two-per-ward basis using a single non-transferable vote. Electors vote for two candidates and the two that receive the largest number of votes are elected.

1959 Sault Ste. Marie municipal election, Alderman, Ward One
Candidate	Total votes	Elected
Tom Angus	1,798	X
Ian Hollingsworth	1,751	X
Joyce Scott	893	

1961 Sault Ste. Marie municipal election, Alderman, Ward One
Candidate	Total votes	Elected
Alex Harry	1,587	X
Tom Angus (i)	1,577	X
Gino Petrocco	770	
Frank Mantello	479	
Hector St. Lewis	200	

1963 Sault Ste. Marie municipal election, Alderman, Ward One
Candidate	Total votes	Elected
Alex Harry (i)	1,607	X
Tom Angus (i)	1,407	X
Jack Books	1,171	

1964 Sault Ste. Marie municipal election, Alderman, Ward One
Candidate	Total votes	Elected
Terrence Murphy	1,942	X
Tom Angus (i)	1,754	X
Jack Books	1,500	

1966 Sault Ste. Marie municipal election, Alderman, Ward One
Candidate	Total votes	Elected
Tom Angus (i)	1,614	X
Frank Shunock	1,604	X
Jack Books	1,499	
Lloyd Kennedy	587	

1968 Sault Ste. Marie municipal election, Alderman, Ward One
Candidate	Total votes	Elected
Ron Irwin	2,431	X
Tom Angus (i)	2,130	X
Pat Mahon	1,899	
Frank Shunock (i)	962	

1970 Sault Ste. Marie municipal election, Alderman, Ward One
Candidate	Total votes	Elected
Tom Angus (i)		acclaimed
Ron Irwin (i)		acclaimed

1972 Sault Ste. Marie municipal election, Alderman, Ward One
Candidate	Total votes	Elected
Tom Angus (i)	2,015	X
Bill Hrynuik	1,066	X
Jack Moore	1,001	
Dunstan Wood	966	
Walter Lukenda	965	
Roy Youngston	674	
Charles Swift	673	
Murray Sheppard	609	

1974 Sault Ste. Marie municipal election, Alderman, Ward One
Candidate	Total votes	Elected
Tom Angus (i)	2,396	X
Bill Hrynuik (i)	2,167	X
T. W. Massicotte	1,467	
Jack Moore	1,922	
Helen Webb	826	
Stan Young	456	

1976 Sault Ste. Marie municipal election, Alderman, Ward One
Candidate	Total votes	Elected
Bill Hrynuik (i)	3,032	X
Tom Angus (i)	3,010	X
Charles Swift	2,472	

1978 Sault Ste. Marie municipal election, Alderman, Ward One
Candidate	Total votes	Elected
Tom Angus (i)	2,540	X
Charles Swift	2,528	X
Bill Hrynuik (i)	2,503	
John Clark	891	

In 1980, Angus decided to run in Ward Two after a 1978 change in ward boundaries put his residence in the city's redrawn Ward Two.

1980 Sault Ste. Marie municipal election, Alderman, Ward Two
Candidate	Total votes	Elected
Tom Angus	3,848	X
Marsh Barsanti (i)	2,654	X
Henry Coyle	2,228	
Robin Thibault	1,586	

1982 Sault Ste. Marie municipal election, Alderman, Ward Two
Candidate	Total votes	Elected
Tom Angus (i)	3,837	X
Tom Gillespie	3,481	X
Marsh Barsanti (i)	2,459	
Udo Rauk	1,454	
Henry Coyle	1,267	

1985 Sault Ste. Marie municipal election, Alderman, Ward Two
Candidate	Total votes	Elected
Tom Angus (i)	3,858	X
Tom Gillespie (i)	3,182	X
Marsh Barsanti	2,767	
Robin Thibault	2,254	

1988 Sault Ste. Marie municipal election, Alderman, Ward Two
Candidate	Total votes	Elected
Tom Angus (i)	2,626	X
Udo Rauk	2,355	X
Marsh Barsanti	2,108	
John Wilson	1,971	
Robin Thibault	1,176	
Les Weeks	1,007	
Jack Hernden	378	
Karl Turner	361	
