= James L. McIntyre =

17th mayor of the city of Sault Ste. Marie, Ontario

James McIntyre
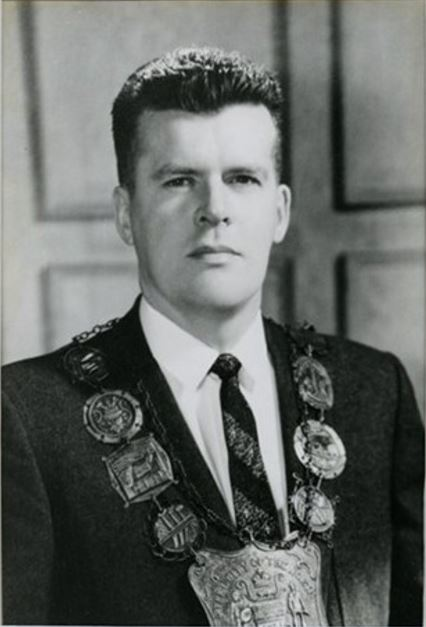

17th Mayor of Sault Ste. Marie, Ontario
- In office January 1, 1960 – January 11, 1965
- Preceded by: Walter Harry
- Succeeded by: Alexander C. Harry

Sault Ste. Marie Alderman, Ward 1
- In office January 1, 1958 – December 31, 1959

Chair of the Sault Ste. Marie Bridge Authority
- In office November 2014 – February 11, 2015

Personal details
- Born: James Lloyd McIntyre; July 12, 1926 Winnipeg, Manitoba
- Died: February 11, 2015 (aged 88) Sault Ste. Marie, Ontario, Canada
- Spouse: Mary Gallivan
- Children: 6

James Lloyd McIntyre (July 12, 1926 - February 11, 2015) was the 17th mayor of the city of Sault Ste. Marie, Ontario. During his three terms from 1960 to 1964, he helped lead a period of transition for the city, including securing the location and construction of the Sault Ste. Marie International Bridge, de-industrialization of the downtown waterfront, and expanding waste water treatment.

Prior to being elected mayor, he served as a city alderman for Ward 1 from 1958 to 1959. After leaving municipal politics in January 1965, McIntyre continued to be involved in civic affairs serving as chair of the police commission, the board of the Sault General Hospital and the District Health Council. He also served on the board of the Sault Ste. Marie Bridge Authority for over fifty years, including as chair of the board from 2014 until his death in 2015. He was chosen to serve on provincial and federal task forces, including negotiations on self-government for Canada's First Nations. He was a recipient of the City of Sault Ste. Marie's Medal of Merit in 1988 for his "outstanding contributions" to the city.

McIntyre died on February 11, 2015, the result of an accident in downtown Sault Ste. Marie.

== Background ==
McIntyre was born in Winnipeg on July 12, 1926. He was educated at St. Paul's Jesuit College but was removed from school at 16 after being diagnosed with polio and bed-ridden for a year.

Recovered, McIntyre began work with Trans-Canada Air Lines in Toronto in 1946 and within a year was transferred to Sault Ste. Marie to manage the office in the city. Arriving in June 1947, the 20 year-old quickly began integrating himself into community life, joining the St. Marys River Boat Club. Interested in groups and organizations, McIntyre was elected treasurer and later president of the club and became involved in the Kinsman Club, Kiwanis, Chamber of Commerce and the board of the Children's Aid Society.

It was at one of his first visits to the boat club that he met Mary Gallivan. The two were married at Precious Blood Cathedral on July 16, 1949. They would have six children: Paul, Patrick, Mary Anne, Catherine, Sheila and Nora.

== School board trustee and city councillor ==
Not long after his arrival, McIntyre was encouraged to get involved in political life of the city. In November 1951, on a friend's urging, he took an appointment to the separate school board. He would later serve as its chair.

While away visiting family in 1957, a group nominated him for a vacant seat on city council in Ward 1. McIntyre agreed and despite residing in another ward and running a minimal campaign, was elected with the highest number of votes of any candidate in any ward in that year's election.

An early advocate of transformation and modernization on council, McIntyre was critical of the city's ward system that he felt advantaged less populous wards in the west end of the city and emphasized ward interests over city-wide concerns. He sponsored unsuccessful motions to study ward boundaries and to put the question doing away with wards to voters in the next city election.

== Mayor ==
Unimpressed by the calibre of those putting themselves forward to replace Walter Harry who was not re-offering as mayor in 1959, McIntyre considered leaving city politics altogether after his one term. However, he was persuaded to run for the mayor's chair instead.

McIntyre's campaign was based on transformational ideas intended to reform city administration and modernize the city in reaction to what he saw as a compliant old-boys club culture in the city.

Prior to announcing his intentions, McIntyre laid out an agenda for civic reform in a speech to the Lion's Club on October 28, 1959, in which he railed against the "almost complete lack of long-range city administrative planning." Specifically he cited the absence of a retirement plan for city employees, the need for council to receive regular spending updates, and the need for citywide approaches to recreation and transit planning. He criticized what he saw as the parochial interests of city councillors, saying "actually we have no ward problems – just ward politicians."

Officially launching his campaign on October 30, 1959, he said "I have been encouraged to stand for this office by the many ratepayers who believe it is time the mayor’s chair was occupied by a young man who is unafraid to express his opinion on current topics regardless of the opposition and will inquire into every detail of civic administration … even if it means changing practices of long-standing."

Again, despite running only a modest campaign, he was elected with 37 per cent of the vote in a field of four candidates including two senior members of council. At 33, he became the city's youngest mayor at that time.

McIntyre was re-elected to another two-year term in 1961. He was again re-elected in 1963 for a term that was limited to only one year due to the provincially-ordered amalgamation of Sault Ste. Marie, Tarentorus and Korah townships. McIntyre attracted a greater number of total votes in each of his subsequent campaigns: 7,481 (52 per cent of the vote) in 1961 and 8,037 (63 per cent of the vote) in 1963.

On August 4, 1964, McIntyre announced that he would not seek re-election in that fall's municipal election. In a prepared statement he cited the time demands of the job, and his expectation that these would only increase with the amalgamation of the city with Korah and Tarentorus townships the following year. He wanted to spend more time with family and settle his conscious about having to ask for so much time away from his regular job with Air Canada. He also hinted that he was seriously considering being a candidate in the next federal election.

McIntyre served as mayor until January 11, 1965, when his successor, Alexander Harry was sworn in.

== Post-mayoral career ==
After leaving politics, McIntyre worked for Algoma Steel and continued to be involved in community work through local boards, and public sector commissions.

=== Algoma Steel ===
A year leaving the mayor's office, McIntyre accepted a role with Algoma Steel as their assistant superintendent of employee relations where he was responsible for education, training and communications with the steel maker's mostly unionized employees. In this role he was often quoted by the media as a spokesperson for the company. He retired twenty years later as the company's manager of personnel.

In retirement he took on consulting work for Batchewana First Nation and other organizations.

=== Boards and commissions ===
McIntyre's longest volunteer commitment was with the Sault Ste. Marie International Bridge, a project that as mayor he had helped to initiate and open to the public on October 31, 1962. He was involved with various organizations as they evolved with the bridge from vision, to creation to its on-going operation.

In 1963 he was appointed to the board of the St. Mary's River Bridge Company and later became its chair. He was also chair of the board of the Sault Ste. Marie Bridge Authority, the international body that oversees the operation of the bridge. He had recently been elected chair of that board at the time of his death.

McIntyre served 23 years on the board supervising Sault Ste. Marie's police service, including as its chairman. Initially serving in his capacity as mayor, he was subsequently reappointed by the province. McIntyre occasionally raised the ire of the local police association who twice unsuccessfully called for his removal, in once instance citing a perceived conflict of interest with his job at Algoma Steel. He left the commission in 1983 when the province introduced 6-year term limits on provincial appointments.

In November 1972, he was named to a provincial commission to study policing across Ontario, including police responsibilities, financing, operations and the role of the Ontario Provincial Police. The commission presented its findings in March 1974.

He served on the board of the Algoma District Health Unit, and was a member of the board of the General Hospital for twelve years. In the fall of 1989 he was appointed as one of 38 members a health strategy council chaired by Ontario premier David Peterson to examine policy options and alternatives for the future direction of Ontario's health care system.

=== 1974 mayoral campaign ===
Almost a decade after leaving office, McIntyre was once again persuaded to stand for election as mayor in 1974 when Ron Irwin left the role. As he had previously, McIntyre ran an economical campaign spending only a few thousand dollars on advertising. Focusing heavily on his past mayoralty, his platform focused on the city's practice of borrowing for operational expenses and what he saw as the council's inability to make decisions, which contributed to higher costs. In response he promised “a systematic approach” to council meetings.

McIntyre fell short, capturing 30 per cent of the vote, to ward four councillor Nick Trbovich's 46 per cent.

=== 1990 language resolution ===
McIntyre became involved in municipal politics again during the city's controversial 1990 resolution declaring English the official language of city hall. Before the resolution reached council, McIntyre was among a group of five former city mayors who tried to persuade then-mayor Joe Fratesi to tread carefully around the language issue.

Fratesi was uninterested in what the former mayors had to tell him. Describing the reception they received, McIntyre recounted, “He was quite insulting that we would condescend to try to tell him how to do his job, that we were history, has-beens, who were we to call him. And so the conversation terminated somewhat unpleasantly.”

When the resolution was contested in court in 1993, McIntyre, clearly still stinging from Fratesi's earlier rebuke, wrote an open letter to The Sault Star criticizing the mayor for putting his ego ahead of the city. A day later, Fratesi responded with a personal note insinuating that McIntyre had been a weak mayor.

Years later, McIntyre lamented the damage the resolution did to Sault Ste. Marie's reputation, saying “we’ve become a synonym for bigotry.”

== Death and tributes ==
On the morning of Wednesday, February 11, 2015, McIntyre was struck by a reversing loader that was clearing snow from the parking lot of a Bay Street hotel near his home. Despite efforts by firefighters and paramedics, McIntyre succumbed to his injuries and was declared dead at the scene.

Investigations by the Sault Ste Marie Police Service and the Ontario Ministry of Labour resulted in no charges being laid. After speaking with a number of witnesses, police concluded that the "threshold for (a) criminal charge just isn't there," and ministry officials decided that "charges under the Occupational Health and Safety Act would not be laid as there was no reasonable prospect of conviction."

A funeral mass was held at Precious Blood Cathedral in Sault Ste. Marie on Wednesday, February 18, 2015. He was interred at the city's Holy Sepulchre Cemetery.

=== Tributes ===
Immediately following his passing, McIntyre was remembered for his decency, professionalism and long service to his community.

In a statement, city mayor Christian Provenzano described him as "a kind man who cared deeply about our community ... We are grateful for Mayor McIntyre's long and tremendous legacy of service to Sault Ste. Marie."

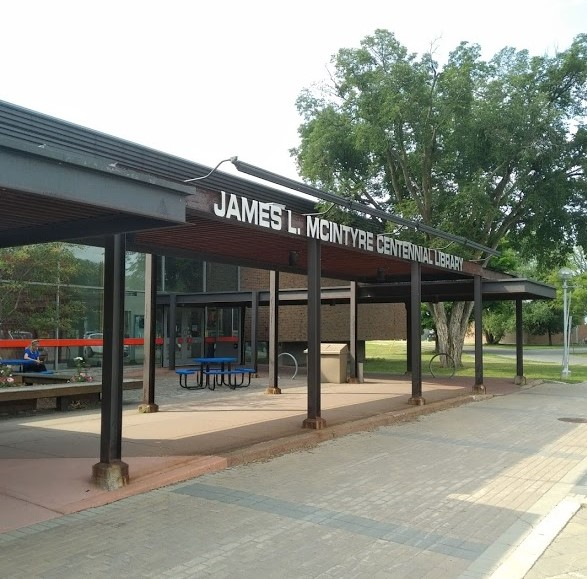
Front portico of the James L. McIntyre Centennial Library in Sault Ste. Marie, Ontario, Canada

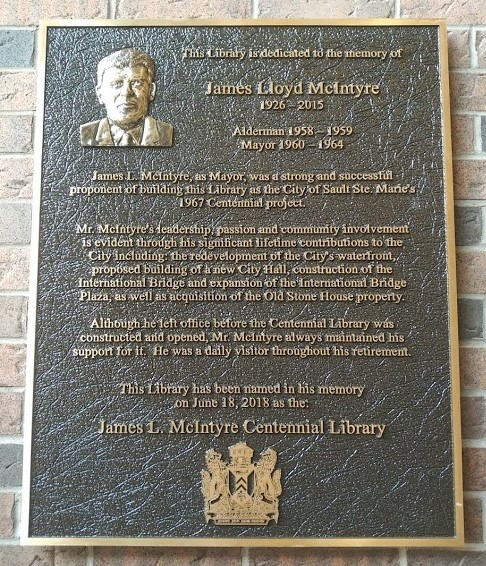
Plaque dedicating the Sault Ste. Marie Library main branch to James L. McIntyre

Former mayor Steve Butland described him as "one of those individuals, when he came into a room, the respect was immediately there," adding "[his] commitment to Sault Ste. Marie ... I don't know if it's unparalleled, but it's up there with [former mayors] John Rhodes, John Roswell and other people who have passed on."

Despite their public disagreement over the language resolution, former mayor Joe Fratesi lauded McIntyre's political judgment, "I think being sensitive to right and wrong and what people need and what people want, none of that will change regardless if it's today or years ago or 75 years ago ... I think he did quite well."

In a statement, Phil Becker, general manager of the Sault Ste. Marie International Bridge Authority described McIntyre as a gentleman whose "integrity - as expressed many times in his firm but fair approach to bridge business - is beyond measure." At its meeting on February 19, the board of the bridge authority passed a resolution commemorating McIntyre's long work on behalf of the bridge and the people served by it.

Micheline Dubé, president and chief executive officer of the Federal Bridge Corporation described being "in awe of his lifetime contribution and more remarkable, well into his eighties, he continued to outpace most Canadians in his passion for serving his community and Canada."

Flags at municipal facilities in Sault Ste. Marie were half-masted on February 12, 2015, until McIntyre's funeral six days later.

Several months after his passing, the Michigan Department of Transportation, which owns the American span of the Sault Ste. Marie International Bridge, announced that McIntyre's contributions to the bridge would be honoured in a display in the lobby of the department's headquarters in Lansing - the first time a Canadian's individual contributions were so-honoured.

One year following his death, Sault Ste. Marie International Bridge Authority announced that the board room of its new administration building would be named after McIntyre in recognition of his long service to the board and as its chairman. In February 2017, the Federal Bridge Corporation announced that a new service building at the Canadian bridge plaza would be named in honour of McIntyre. In their press release, the authority noted the prominence of the new building saying, "Every single traveler across the Sault Ste. Marie International Bridge, northbound or southbound has a clear view of this building. It is the first Canadian building viewed as one enters Canada and the last one seen as you cross the international bridge into the United States." The formal naming ceremony took place on May 17, 2017.

In the summer of 2016, a city committee was tasked to recommend a suitable way to honour McIntyre, in cooperation with his family. Possibilities included renaming the Centennial Library, the Police Services headquarters or the parkette across from the international bridge. On June 18, 2018, the city formally renamed the library main branch the James L. McIntyre Centennial Library.

== Electoral Results ==
=== Alderman ===
Aldermen were elected on a two-per-ward basis using a single non-transferable vote.

1957 Sault Ste. Marie municipal election, Alderman, Ward One
Candidate	Total votes	Elected
James McIntyre	914	X
Stan Fisher (i)	895	X
Wesley Hill	803	
Orval Grant	555	

=== Mayor ===
1959 Sault Ste. Marie municipal election, Mayor of Sault Ste. Marie
Candidate	Total votes	% of total votes
James McIntyre	4,344	36.9
Wesley W. Hill	3,000	25.5
Peter King	2,338	19.9
Stan Fisher	2,090	17.8
Total valid votes	11,772	100.00

1961 Sault Ste. Marie municipal election, Mayor of Sault Ste. Marie
Candidate	Total votes	% of total votes
James McIntyre (i)	7,481	51.6
Wesley W. Hill	7,011	48.4
Total valid votes	14,492	100.00

1963 Sault Ste. Marie municipal election, Mayor of Sault Ste. Marie
Candidate	Total votes	% of total votes
James McIntyre (i)	8,037	63.4
Melvin G. Radke	4,647	36.6
Total valid votes	12,684	100.00

1974 Sault Ste. Marie municipal election, Mayor of Sault Ste. Marie
Candidate	Total votes	% of total votes
Nick Trbovich	12,383	45.5
James McIntyre	8,091	29.7
Marsh Barsanti	6,730	27.7
Total valid votes	27,204	100.00
