= Russ Ramsay =

Canadian politician (1928–2003)

Ontario MPP
- In office 1978–1985
- Preceded by: John Rhodes
- Succeeded by: Karl Morin-Strom
- Constituency: Sault Ste. Marie

Personal details
- Born: August 5, 1928 Sault Ste. Marie, Ontario
- Died: February 9, 2003 (aged 74) Sault Ste. Marie, Ontario
- Party: Progressive Conservative
- Spouse: Margaret
- Children: 5
- Occupation: Radio station manager

Russell Harold Ramsay (August 5, 1928 — February 9, 2003) was a politician in Ontario, Canada. He served as a member of the Sault Ste. Marie city council before being elected to the Legislative Assembly of Ontario in 1978. He was a cabinet minister in the government of William Davis from 1981 to 1985. Ramsay was a member of the Progressive Conservative Party.

== Background ==
Ramsay was born in Sault Ste. Marie, and was educated in that city and at Queen's University in Kingston. He became manager of CJIC-TV in 1956, and served as vice-president of Huron Broadcasting. Ramsay was the recipient of a Centennial Medal in 1967, and was named "Man of the Year" by Sault Ste. Marie's Rotary Club in 1969. He was a member of the Sault Ste. Marie city council from January to June 1975. He was married to Margaret with whom he raised five children.

== Politics ==
Ramsay first campaigned for the Algoma West seat in the House of Commons in the 1965 federal election but lost to Liberal candidate George Nixon. He ran again in 1968, this time against Liberal Terry Murphy in Sault Ste. Marie but lost again.

In 1974, Ramsay ran to represent Ward 2 on Sault Ste. Marie's city council. He was elected in the December 2, 1974 municipal election.

Following the death of Progressive Conservative cabinet minister John Rhodes, Ramsay was persuaded to run in the December 14, 1978 by-election to represent Sault Ste. Marie in the Ontario legislature. He was elected by a comfortable 5,815 vote margin over the New Democratic Party candidate. Three years later, he was re-elected with 50 percent of the vote in the 1981 provincial election. He was appointed to cabinet as Provincial Secretary for Resources Development on April 10, 1981. He was promoted to Minister of Labour on February 13, 1982.

Following the premier's autumn 1984 decision to step down, Ramsay supported Larry Grossman's unsuccessful bid to replace Bill Davis as Progressive Conservative leader in February 1985.

In the 1985 provincial election that followed, Ramsay lost his seat to New Democratic Party candidate Karl Morin-Strom by 1,069 votes. His loss was attributed to a weak provincial campaign by the Progressive Conservatives, and by some to Ramsay's suggestion that equal pay for women could cause some businesses to shut down.

In 1996, Ramsay ran in a mayoral by-election in Sault Ste. Marie to replace Joe Fratesi who had left to become the city's chief administrative officer, but he was defeated by former federal MP Steve Butland.

=== Cabinet positions ===
Davis ministry, Province of Ontario (1971–1985)
Cabinet posts (2)
| Predecessor | Office | Successor |
| Robert Elgie | Minister of Labour; 1982–1985 | Robert Elgie |
| René Brunelle | Provincial Secretary for Resources Development; 1981–1982 | Lorne Henderson |

== Later life ==
In January 1987, he was appointed to the Health Discipline Board and the Denture Therapists Appeal Board. Three months later he was appointed executive vice president and general manager of the Industrial Accident Prevention Association. He stayed in that position until 1995 when the board was eliminated by the Mike Harris administration.

From January 1990 to February 1999 he wrote a regular column in The Sault Star on local sports and the history and traditions of the city.

== Honours ==
In October 1991, in recognition to his contributions to sport in the city, the Sault Ste. Marie Museum named its new gallery the Russell H. Ramsay Sports History Hall of Fame.

On April 22, 1993 Ramsay was named a member of the Order of Canada. His citation read,

Dedicated to community involvement, he has made many contributions to Sault Ste. Marie's artistic, recreational, civic and charitable organizations throughout his career in radio broadcasting and provincial politics. A long-time sports promoter and an active fundraiser for the James Norris Athletic Complex, he also created the annual B'nai Brith Scholarship Trophy as an inspiration for young athletes to strive for excellence.

In July 1993 he was named to the Order of Ontario. In April of that same year he was named distinguished citizen of the year by Lake Superior State University in Sault Ste. Marie, Michigan.

The Sault Ste. Marie Chamber of Commerce awarded Ramsay the Paul Dalseg community achievement award in 2000.

In July 2000, Sault Ste. Marie's city council renamed the Algoma boardroom at the city's civic centre after him. In addition, Ferry Street, the lower part of Brock Street leading to the civic centre was renamed Russ Ramsay Way.

== Death ==
Ramsay died on February 9, 2003 at a Sault Ste. Marie nursing home, at age 73. He had previously been diagnosed with Alzheimer's disease. He was interred at Sault Ste. Marie's Holy Sepulchre Cemetery.

In 2009, he was posthumously inducted into the Sault Ste. Marie Walk of Fame in recognition of the "community-mindedness of Russ as business man, politician and volunteer."

== Electoral results ==
Ontario provincial by-election, December 14, 1978
| Party | Candidate | Votes | % | ±% |
|---|---|---|---|---|
| Progressive Conservative | Russ Ramsay | 15,960 | 52.14 | -3.14 |
| New Democratic | Ron Moreau | 10,145 | 33.14 | -0.42 |
| Liberal | Ron Luciano | 4,505 | 14.72 | +4.03 |
| Total valid votes | | 30,610 | 100.00 | |
| Progressive Conservative hold | | Swing | | -1.36 |

1981 Ontario general election
| Party | Candidate | Votes | % | ±% |
|---|---|---|---|---|
| Progressive Conservative | Russ Ramsay | 14,712 | 49.99 | -5.29 |
| Liberal | Albert Ferranti | 7,555 | 25.67 | +14.98 |
| New Democratic | Susan Brothers | 7,162 | 24.34 | -9.22 |
| Total valid votes | | 29,429 | 100.00 | |
| Progressive Conservative hold | | Swing | | -10.14 |

^ Change from general election

1985 Ontario general election
| Party | Candidate | Votes | % | ±% |
|---|---|---|---|---|
| New Democratic | Karl Morin-Strom | 16,362 | 44.85 | +20.51 |
| Progressive Conservative | Russ Ramsay | 15,293 | 41.92 | -8.08 |
| Liberal | Ray Youngson | 4,830 | 13.24 | -12.43 |
| Total valid votes | | 36,485 | 100.00 | |
| New Democratic gain from Progressive Conservative | | Swing | | +14.29 |
