= Karl Morin-Strom =

Canadian politician

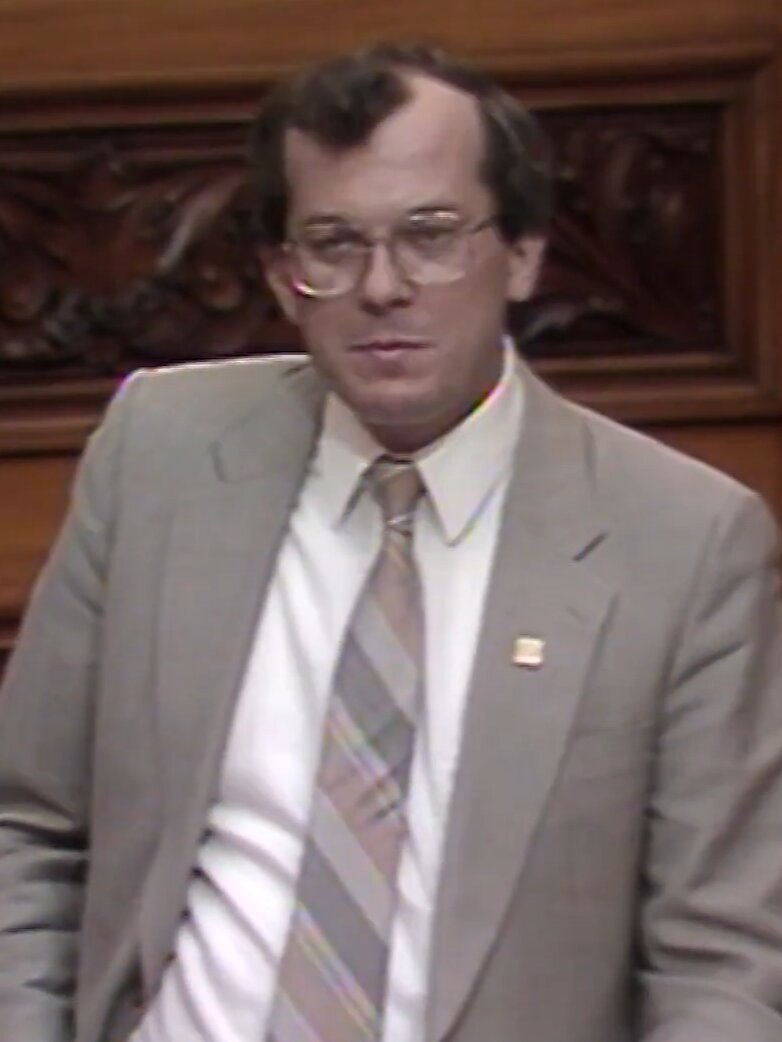
- Morin-Strom in 1986

Member of Provincial Parliament for Sault Ste. Marie
- In office May 2, 1985 – September 5, 1990
- Preceded by: Russ Ramsay
- Succeeded by: Tony Martin
- Constituency: Sault Ste. Marie

Personal details
- Born: Karl Arvid Strom; June 27, 1952 (age 73) Sault Ste. Marie, Ontario
- Party: New Democrat
- Spouse: Bernadette Morin
- Children: 3

Karl Arvid Morin-Strom (born June 27, 1952) is a former politician in Ontario, Canada. He served in the Legislative Assembly of Ontario from 1985 to 1990 as a member of the New Democratic Party.

== Background ==
Strom was born in Sault Ste. Marie, Ontario. He attended Sir James Dunn Collegiate and Vocational School. Showing an aptitude for mathematics, he participated in contests provincially and nationally at both the Junior (grades 9–11) and Senior (grades 12–13) levels. He was the first ever winner of the Canadian Mathematical Olympiad in 1969. He continued his education at Harvard University and the Massachusetts Institute of Technology in Cambridge, receiving a PhD from the latter institution in 1977. His dissertation was entitled "Witt Theorems for Lattices over Discrete Valuation Rings". He worked as a corporate planner and financial analyst.

In 1972, he married Bernadette Morin and he changed his last name to Morin-Strom. Together, they raised three daughters, including Marie Morin-Strom, who unsuccessfully ran for the NDP in the Sault Ste. Marie riding in the 2021 Canadian federal election.

== Politics ==
He ran for the New Democratic Party in the 1984 federal election, but lost to Progressive Conservative Jim Kelleher in the Sault Ste. Marie riding by 2,409 votes.

Persuaded to try provincial politics, the following year he defeated Progressive Conservative cabinet minister Russ Ramsay in the riding of Sault Ste. Marie in the 1985 Ontario election by 1,069 votes. He was re-elected in the 1987 Ontario election.

In 1985 he was appointed as his party's critic for industry, trade and technology. In 1987 he added critic responsibilities for transportation and financial institutions.

Morin-Strom decided not to re-offer in the 1990 election in part as a protest against the controversial decision by Sault Ste. Marie's city council to declare English the official language of the municipality.

== Later life ==
During his retirement, he has learned German and has extensively travelled Europe.

== Electoral results ==
=== Federal ===
1984 Canadian federal election
Party	Candidate	Votes	%	±%
Progressive Conservative	Jim Kelleher	13,135	38.60	+25.68
New Democratic	Karl Morin-Strom	10,726	31.52	-7.42
Liberal	Ron Irwin	9,972	29.30	-18.66
Commonwealth of Canada	Charles L. Rooney	198	0.58	
Total		34,031	100.00	

=== Provincial ===
1985 Ontario general election
Party	Candidate	Votes	%	±%
New Democratic	Karl Morin-Strom	16,362	44.85	+20.51
Progressive Conservative	Russ Ramsay	15,293	41.92	-8.08
Liberal	Ray Youngson	4,830	13.24	-12.43
Total valid votes		36,485	100.00	
New Democratic gain from Progressive Conservative		Swing		+14.29

1987 Ontario general election
Party	Candidate	Votes	%	±%
New Democratic	Karl Morin-Strom	19,064	49.00	+4.15
Liberal	Albert Ferranti	16,381	42.10	+28.86
Progressive Conservative	Udo Rauk	3,464	8.90	-33.01
Total valid votes		38,900	100.00	
New Democratic hold		Swing		-12.36
