= John Rhodes (Canadian politician) =

Canadian politician (1929–1978)

19th Mayor of the City of Sault Ste. Marie, Ontario
- In office 1969–1971
- Preceded by: Alexander C. Harry
- Succeeded by: Ron Irwin

Member of Provincial Parliament for Sault Ste. Marie
- In office October 21, 1971 – September 25, 1978
- Preceded by: Arthur Wishart
- Succeeded by: Russ Ramsay

Personal details
- Born: September 26, 1929 Sault Ste. Marie, Ontario
- Died: September 25, 1978 (aged 48) Tehran, Iran
- Party: Progressive Conservative
- Spouse: Vivian Louise Shook
- Children: 3

John Reginald Rhodes (September 26, 1929 – September 25, 1978) was a Canadian broadcaster and politician. He served as the 19th mayor of Sault Ste. Marie, as a Progressive Conservative member of the Legislative Assembly of Ontario, and as an Ontario cabinet minister. He died in office while on an official visit to the Middle East in 1978.

== Background ==
Rhodes was born September 26, 1929, in Sault Ste. Marie, Ontario, the son of John Francis Rhodes, a municipal employee. He received his education at Sault Collegiate Institute, but quit in grade 11. After working at the chromium plant at Algoma Steel, he became a municipal police officer, the second youngest at the time, rising to the rank of sergeant.

In 1955, he married Vivian Louise Shook. The couple had three children.

In 1957, Rhodes was hired as an on-air announcer at CJIC radio. He had worked part-time at the station while in high school and once told an interviewer that he was offered the full-time job after stopping by the station just to get out of the cold one morning. Considered a natural in front of a microphone, Rhodes continued to work at the station hosting sports coverage and evening broadcasts through his time as mayor, until being elected to the Ontario legislature in 1971.

== Politics ==
Rhodes was elected to Sault Ste. Marie City Council in 1964 and 1966 representing Ward 2. He was elected mayor in 1968 and re-elected to the office by acclamation in 1970.

In 1971, local Progressive Conservatives were looking for a replacement for Arthur Wishart, the sitting MPP who had announced he would not seek reelection. Wishart persuaded Rhodes to seek the party's nomination for the up-coming provincial election. Despite having supported Liberal candidates in the past, Rhodes was able to argue that switching parties was not uncommon. He took the nomination and went on to win the Sault Ste. Marie seat by 1,000 votes over his New Democratic Party opponent. He was re-elected in 1975 and 1977.

In 1974, Premier Bill Davis appointed him to cabinet as Minister of Transportation and Communications. In this role, he opposed a seat belt law and helmets for moped drivers. He allowed the paving of Toronto's Spadina Expressway from Lawrence to Eglinton.

In October 1975 he was shuffled to the Minister of Housing. In January 1978 he was moved to the Minister of Industry and Tourism.

As the principal minsiter responsible for economic development and job creation, Rhodes took a global view and was credited to this pronouncement in response to concerns about job loss to international competition, according to Queen's Park press gallary veteran Eric Dowd:

Canadian is someone who leaves a French movie, climbs in his German car, drives to an Italian restaurant, orders Dutch beer and Danish cheese and, once home, takes off his Korean shirt, Romanian pants and Polish shoes and puts on his Taiwanese pyjamas. Then he turns on his Japanese stereo, picks up his U.S.-made pen and writes to his MP protesting about high unemployment.

— John Rhodes, Minister of Industry and Tourism

== Death ==
Rhodes died in Tehran, Iran on September 25, 1978, one day short of his 49th birthday. He had been part of an official delegation to the region along with Premier Davis. While on the flight from Cairo, Egypt, Rhodes complained of feeling ill. Upon landing in Tehran, he was taken immediately to the Canadian embassy where doctors attended to him. While his condition was stable for a time, it quickly worsened. Despite the life-saving efforts of his Ontario Provincial Police security detail, Rhodes died at a near-by American military hospital. The attending doctors concluded he had died of a massive heart attack.

Speaking to the media that day, a shaken Premier Davis said "Mr. Rhodes was a very dear friend of mine, an able public servant who served his constituency. And for those of us who knew him, he had a great sensitivity along with a sense of humor. He did a great job in three different cabinet posts."

On October 6, 1978, Rhodes was given a non-denominational funeral service at St. Andrews United Church in Sault Ste. Marie attended by Premier Davis and other provincial and municipal officials. His remains were interred in the city's Greenwood Cemetery.

Rhodes' death in 1978 was the last time, as of June 2026, a member of Ontario cabinet died in office.

== Tributes ==
Upon learning of his death, both opposition leaders in the Ontario legislature lauded Rhodes for his character and service. Liberal leader Stuart Smith called Rhodes "one of the ablest and warmly human members of the provincial legislature". New Democrat leader Michael Cassidy said, he was an "engaging fellow who played the political game with an enormous amount of gusto. He enjoyed respect from all sides of the house."

Sault Ste. Marie mayor Nick Trbovich, who had served with him on council said "I admired his work not only as a member of the provincial government and cabinet, but for the efforts he has placed in working for the municipality...He was very dedicated not only to serving his people but to his family."

Long-serving council member Tom Angus said "There's no way to sum up what the loss of John Rhodes is going to mean. He did a great deal for the city, as well as the province. He was a great friend."

Speaking at his funeral service, Premier Davis said "John Rhodes was a big man. He could lead when others were afraid. He could laugh when others despaired and he could humanize the most stuffy and remote. John was a man of great patience when it came to helping people. But he was also a man of great impatience when up against the system, the jargon and the programs that stood between him and the ordinary people to whom he devoted his life serving."

Sault Ste. Marie's John Rhodes Community Centre is named for him.

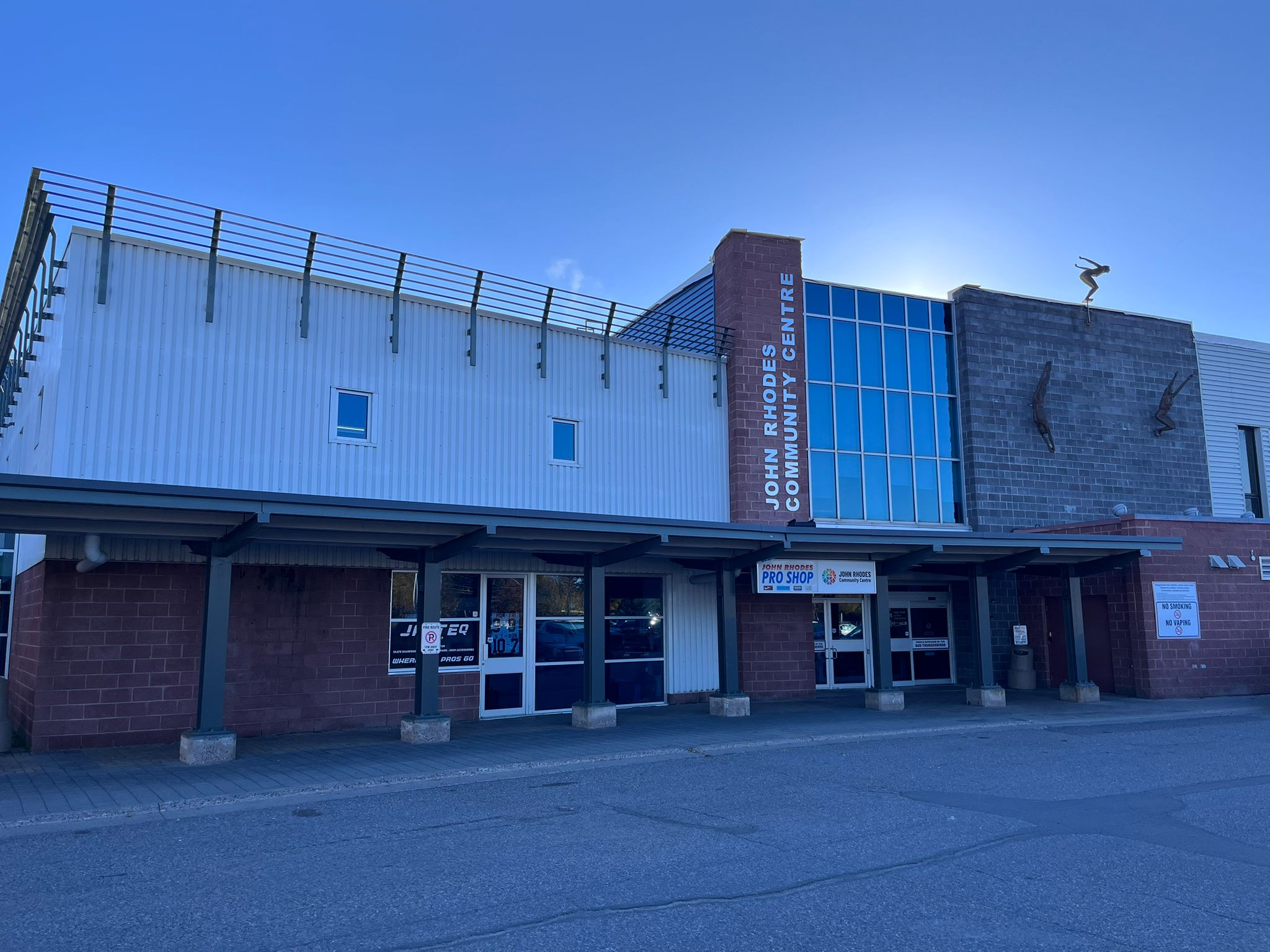
The John Rhodes Community Centre in Sault Ste. Marie, Ontario

In 1979, Algoma University established a scholarship in Rhodes' name "awarded to a high school graduate who embodies the integrity, leadership, and commitment to community service demonstrated by Rhodes throughout his life as a broadcaster, community member, and politician."

From 1981 to 2004, the John R. Rhodes Driver Examination Centre operated in Malton, Ontario.

He was named posthumously to the Sault Ste. Marie Walk of Fame in September 2007.

== Electoral record ==
1971 Ontario general election: Sault Ste. Marie
Party	Candidate	Votes	%
Progressive Conservative	John Rhodes	14,983	42.99
New Democratic	Anne Valentine	13,938	39.99
Liberal	James Hilsinger	5,915	16.97
Total valid votes		34,846	100.00
Rejected, unmarked and declined ballots		174	
Turnout		35,020	79.24
Electors on the lists		44,195	

1975 Ontario general election: Sault Ste. Marie
Party	Candidate	Votes	%
Progressive Conservative	John Rhodes	14,415	42.46
New Democratic	Ronald Moreau	13,470	39.67
Liberal	Robert Gernon	5,835	17.19
Communist	Gordon Massie	232	0.68
Total valid votes		33,952	100.00
Rejected, unmarked and declined ballots		177	
Turnout		34,129	70.91
Electors on the lists		48,133	

1977 Ontario general election: Sault Ste. Marie
Party	Candidate	Votes	%
Progressive Conservative	John Rhodes	19,209	55.28
New Democratic	Donald Burgess	11,660	33.56
Liberal	John Nelson	3715	10.69
Communist	Arlene Bovingdon	162	0.47
Total valid votes		34,746	100.00
Rejected, unmarked and declined ballots		239	
Turnout		34,985	69.64
Electors on the lists		50,240	

=== Cabinet positions ===
Davis ministry, Province of Ontario (1971–1985)
Cabinet posts (3)
Predecessor	Office	Successor
Claude Bennett	Minister of Industry and Tourism; 1978 (January–September)	Larry Grossman
Bob Welch	Minister of Housing; 1975–1978	Claude Bennett
Gordon Carton	Transportation and Communications; 1974–1975	James Snow
