= Sault Ste. Marie City Council =

Governing body of Sault Ste. Marie, Ontario

Type
- Type: Unicameral city council

History
- Established: April 16, 1912; 1918 (amalgamation); 1965 (amalgamation)
- New session started: November 16, 2026

Leadership
- Mayor (head of council): Matthew Shoemaker since November 15, 2022

Structure
- Seats: 10 Councillors and one Mayor
- Length of term: 4 years
- Authority: Municipal Act, 2001, S.O. 2001, c. 25

Elections
- Last election: Monday, October 26, 2026
- Next election: Monday, October 28, 2030

Meeting place
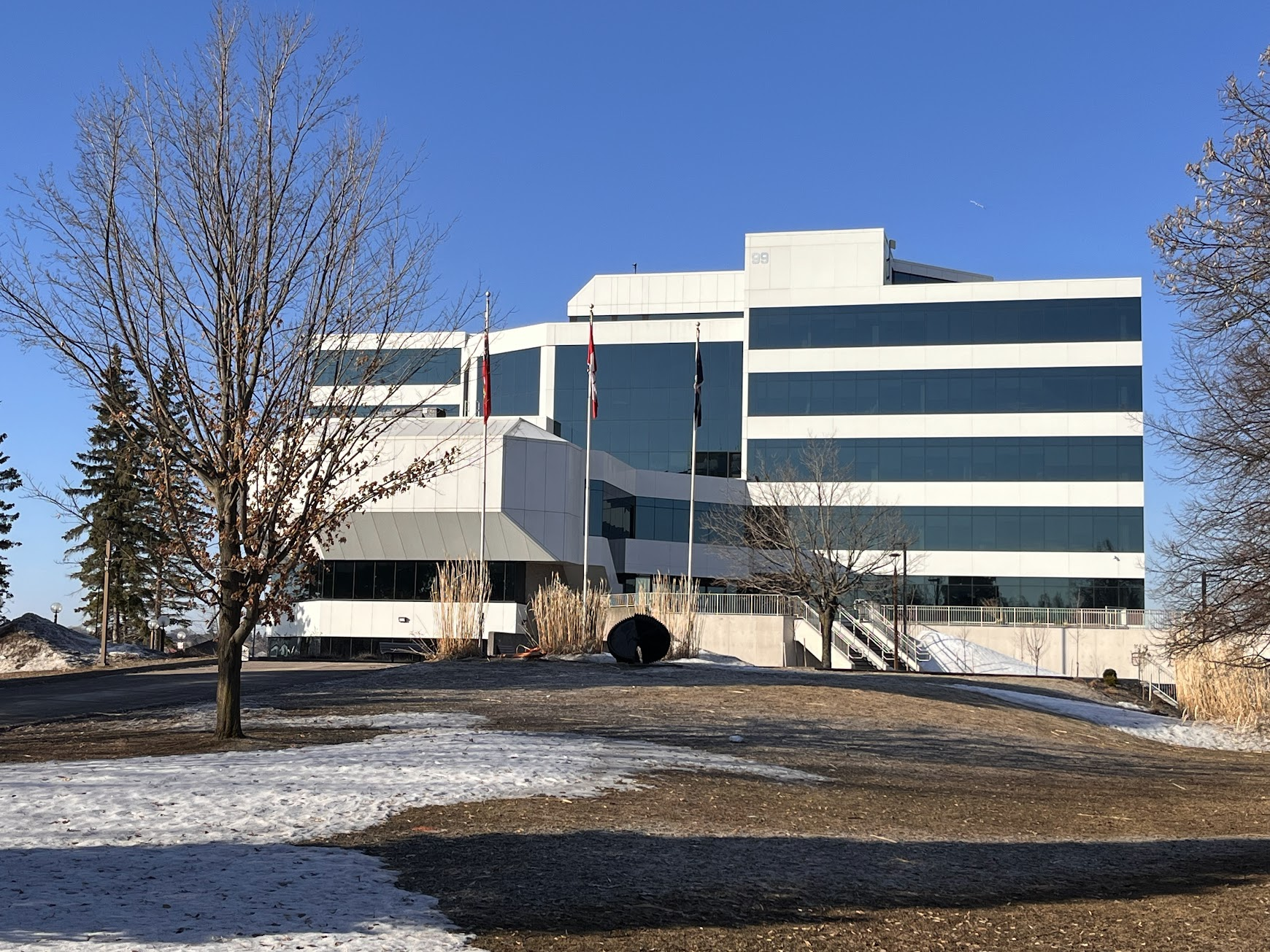
- Ronald A. Irwin Civic Centre

Website
- Official website

Sault Ste. Marie City Council is the governing body of the municipal government of Sault Ste. Marie, Ontario. Meeting at the Ronald A. Irwin Civic Centre on the city's waterfront, it consists of ten city councillors and the mayor of Sault Ste. Marie.

== Structure and function ==
Under the terms of Ontario's Municipal Act, 2001, the entire city council is elected every four years on the fourth Monday of October.

The council's function is to set the direction for the municipality, its programs and services, while ensuring that the public's interest is being represented and upheld.

More specifically, council passes by-laws and resolutions as needed, with the authority to approve the city budget, and set policy and committee processes.

Sault Ste. Marie council operates on a committee of the whole structure, meaning that almost all matters are directly considered by the whole council, rather than standing committees of councillors as exists in other Ontario municipalities like Toronto. Council does use advisory committees composed of councillors and members of the public for some matters. These committees deliberate and make recommendations that are considered by the whole of council.

Administration of the city's day-to-day operations and finances is delegated to the city's Chief Administrative Officer (CAO), the city's senior most official who directs other city staff in accordance with decisions adopted by the whole of council.

At council meetings, the mayor and councillors each have one vote and a majority vote decides most matters.

The council meets approximately every three weeks on Mondays, however only one meeting a month is held in the summer.

=== Mayor ===
As the head of council, the mayor is the chief executive officer of the municipality. They are principally responsible for presiding over the meetings of the council and being the chief public spokesperson for the city and council. In addition, the mayor has certain powers under Part VI.1 of Ontario's Municipal Act, 2001 to direct the work of city staff and determine the organizational structure of city hall.

The mayor is elected by a city-wide vote on a first-past-the-post basis.

The city's current mayor is Matthew Shoemaker, a former two-term city councillor, now serving in his second term as mayor following reelection in 2026. He was first sworn in on November 15, 2022 His current term will end on November 14, 2030.

=== Councillors ===
Councillors act as representatives of their wards at council meetings, on city advisory committees and with the public. They also work to help constituents navigate city hall and services and work to address problems or complaints.

Two councillors are elected from each of the city's five geographically defined wards using a single non-transferable vote. Electors may cast their ballot for up to two candidates and the two that receive the largest number of votes in each ward are declared elected.

=== Current councillors ===
The current council's term of office began on November 15, 2026 and will end on November 14, 2030, following elections that will be held in all Ontario municipalities on Monday, October 28, 2030.

Ward	Councillor	First elected
1	Brent Deroche	2026
1	Logan Costa	2026
2	Luke Dufour	2018
2	Stepanie Pagnucco	2026
3	Gary Trembinski	2026
3	Luis Moreno	2026
4	Marchy Bruni	2010
4	Stephan Kinach	2022
5	Corey Gardi	2018
5	Matthew Scott	2018

== History ==
Prior to becoming a city in 1912, Sault Ste. Marie had been a township governed by council that included a mayor and six councillors elected at-large. Once incorporated as a city on April 16, 1912, the former town council headed by Mayor William H. Munro became the first council of the new city. Munro and council governed the city until their terms ended early the following year.

The provincial government's Act to incorporate the City of Sault Ste. Marie left most things as they had been under the previous township, such as boundaries, by-laws, regulations, contracts, and employees. However, beginning in 1913 the number of councillors, styled "aldermen" in the statute, would increase from six to eight. The statute envisioned that number increasing up to ten once the census population had exceeded 15,000.

Voters had the opportunity to elect their first city council in January 1913. It consisted of a mayor, Thomas E. Simpson and eight aldermen elected at-large from across the city. At the time the mayor and council were elected to a one year term with elections occurring each January.

After only two elections, council petitioned the province to replace the at-large system with a system of wards, where aldermen would represent geographic sections of the city, as existed in other large cities and had been used in the town until 1899. The province allowed a plebiscite on the matter which was approved in January 1915 by a vote of 1,110 to 459. The municipal election that occurred on January 3, 1916 was the first under the ward system, with the city divided into four wards with two aldermen representing each. Councillors have continued to be elected on a ward system since then.

Following a plebiscite of its residents, the town of Steelton, and its 7,000 residents amalgamated with the city of Sault Ste. Marie on January 1, 1918. This resulted in two more wards being added to the council for a total of six wards and twelve aldermen. This would be the only change to the number of councillors and wards until 2018.

The first honorariums for councillors were paid in 1928. Following the practice of similar-sized cities, council voted to provide each alderman an honorarium of $5 per meeting they attended, capped at $120 a year.

In May 1946, the council agreed to move election day to the first Monday in December. Until then municipal elections had tended to be held on or near the first Monday of the new year. Moving the vote earlier in the calendar prevented elections happening too close to the holiday period, avoided winter storms that could effect turn-out, and conformed with the practices of most other Ontario municipalities. The municipal election that year was held on Monday, December 9; elections would continue to be held in December until 1978.

Following a provincial order, on January 1, 1965 the townships of Korah and Tarentorus were amalgamated into Sault Ste. Marie. Unlike the earlier amalgamation of Steelton, this merger saw no increase in the number of councillors. Instead the plan redrew the existing six wards to include the new parts of the city.

In the summer of 1975, the staff and council moved to a new city hall on the city's waterfront. The earlier city hall at 749 Queen Street East was demolished that summer.

In 1978, the provincial government changed the municipal election date from the first Monday in December to the second Monday in November and required that council hold its inaugural meeting and swearing in in mid-December.

The city council's term of office had been two years since 1941. This was expanded to three years beginning with the 1982 city election. Twenty-four years later, the provincial government increased terms to four years beginning with the November 13, 2006 municipal election.

On January 29, 1990, the city council ignited a nation-wide controversy by adopting a resolution declaring English the sole working language of city government. The resolution, which had been pushed for by a small group in the city, was seen as unnecessary and provocative. It also became a flashpoint in the debate around the Meech Lake Accord. In June 1994, the Ontario Court struck down the resolution, finding that the council did not have the power to make such a declaration. Twenty years after the original resolution was passed, then-mayor John Rowswell apologized to French Canadians for the resolution. In January 2024, thirty-four years after the original resolution, council unanimously approved a resolution sponsored by Mayor Matthew Shoemaker directing that the city would make "valiant efforts" to provide city services in French to residents who request it. Shoemaker said the resolution was a deliberate attempt to heal old wounds with the city's Francophone community, adding “I don’t think we’ve ever had full closure on this issue and I’m hoping this will help with that closure.”

In December 1991, the council voted almost unanimously to recommend that the title "alderman" be replaced with "councillor". The former term had been adopted when the municipality became a city in 1912. Preceding that, the title "town councillor" had been used. The 1991 decision reversed the stance taken by council in January 1987, when following an emotional debate, the council narrowly defeated a motion by Joan DesJardins, the only woman on council at the time to change the title to "councillor".

In 1996, the council became the centre of controversy when it appointed Joe Fratesi, the mayor at the time, to the city's top staff job. Fratesi was twice found to have violated conflict of interest legislation when he applied for and accepted the chief administrative officer position while still mayor. Following a heated debate, on December 6, 1996 the council voted to let Fratesi stay on as CAO. He would remain in that role until retiring in 2015.

In March 2017, the council chose to reduce its total number of representatives, from 12 councillors representing six wards to 10 councillors in five wards. Mayor Christian Provenzano argued that "we have more councillors per capita than the vast majority of communities we compare to". Wards were redrawn and the change came into effect for the 2018 municipal election.

=== Notable milestones ===
Coincidentally, it was almost 25 years to the day between Sault Ste. Marie becoming a town and it becoming a city. The legislation that established the town received royal assent on April 23, 1887, while the legislation that incorporated it as a city received royal assent on April 12, 1912.

The first vacancy on city council occurred with the death of alderman Dr. Thomas McQuaid in 1917.

In 1918 council filled a vacancy for a councillor who had gone missing. Having been missing for three months, in May 1918 the council declared alderman and former mayor William H. Munro's Ward Two seat vacant. Following a nomination period, the council elected W. J. Jeffery by acclimation to fill the remainder of the term. Three months later, Munro's remains were found in the St. Marys River, the result of an accidental drowning that January.

Later that same year the council had to fill a vacancy in the mayor's chair. On August 15, 1918, Mayor Francis Crawford announced his intention to resign to become the city's first permanent assessor. The following evening, for the first time in its short history, the city council conducted an election of its own to choose a new mayor. Three sitting aldermen were nominated. The remaining council members elected Thomas Dean as mayor for the remaining four and a half months of the council's term. At noon on August 15, the city clerk formally swore Dean in as the city's fifth mayor.

In 1964, Vera Falldien became the first woman elected to the council. She had been a five-year veteran of the former Tarentorous council prior to amalgamation. It would be another 21 years before the next woman councillor, Joan Desjardins would be elected in Ward Six.

Having retired in 2014 at the age of 87, Frank Manzo is the oldest person to have served on city council. He is also the council's longest serving councillor, serving a total of 38 years from 1969 to 2014, with a six year interruption following an unsuccessful bid for mayor in 1994.

First elected in 1959, Tom Angus is the council's longest continuously serving member, representing Ward One and then Ward Two for 31 consecutive years until deciding not to re-offer in 1991 at the age of 76.

John Rowswell was the first mayor to die while in office. Passing away on August 31, 2010, Rowswell was in his third term as mayor at the time.

In 2010, Debbie Amaroso became the first woman to be elected mayor of Sault Ste. Marie. Two female councillors, Lorena Tridico and Susan Myers, each served one month as acting mayor following John Rowswell's death in 2010.

In June 2017, for the first time in its history, a vacancy on council was filled by drawing a name from a fish bowl. Instead of a ward by-election, council used its option to fill a vacancy in Ward Six with an election by council members. When a third round of voting resulted in a tie, Ozzie Grandinetti was declared elected when, following tradition in the province, names were placed in a glass fishbowl and drawn by the city clerk.

== Past councils ==
City councils since 1965 when the city of Sault Ste. Marie amalgamated with Korah and Tarentorus townships.

=== 1965-1966 Council ===
Council elected in the December 7, 1964 municipal election.

- Mayor — Alex C. Harry
- Ward 1 — C. Terrence Murphy, Tom Angus
- Ward 2 — John Rhodes, Stan Fisher
- Ward 3 — Vera Falldein, Don Macgreggor
- Ward 4 — Mike Sanzosti, W.W. Hare
- Ward 5 — Walter Chisholm, Art Gualazzi
- Ward 6 — Peter King, Paul Upper

=== 1967-1968 Council ===
Council elected in the December 5, 1966 municipal election.

- Mayor — Alex C. Harry
- Ward 1 — Tom Angus, Frank Shunock
- Ward 2 — John Rhodes, Stan Fisher
- Ward 3 — Vera Falldein, Don Macgreggor
- Ward 4 — Ray Stortini, Robert Collins
- Ward 5 — Walter Chisholm, Art Gualazzi
- Ward 6 — Peter King, Paul Upper

=== 1969-1970 Council ===
Council elected in the December 2, 1968 municipal election.

- Mayor — John Rhodes
- Ward 1 — Tom Angus, Ron Irwin
- Ward 2 — Stan Fisher, Harold Tolley
- Ward 3 — Russ Hilderley, Don Macgreggor
- Ward 4 — Robert Collins, Ray Stortini
- Ward 5 — Walter Chisholm, Art Gualazzi
- Ward 6 — Peter King, Frank Manzo

=== 1971-1972 Council ===
Council elected in the December 7, 1970 municipal election.

- Mayor — John Rhodes^{ᛡ}
- Ward 1 — Tom Angus, Ron Irwin^{ᛡᛡ}
- Ward 2 — Marsh Barsanti, Gerry McGuire
- Ward 3 — John Frolick, Don Macgreggor
- Ward 4 — Nick Trbovich, Bob Collins
- Ward 5 — Walter Chisholm, Art Gualazzi
- Ward 6 — Frank Manzo, Peter King

^{ᛡ}Council selected Ron Irwin to serve the remainder of Rhodes' term as mayor. Rhodes had been elected to the Legislative Assembly of Ontario on October 21, 1971.
^{ᛡᛡ}James Gallagher was elected by a vote of council to succeed Ron Irwin as Ward 1 alderman.

=== 1973-1974 Council ===
Council elected in the December 4, 1972 municipal election.

- Mayor — Ron Irwin
- Ward 1 — Tom Angus, William Hrynuik
- Ward 2 — Marsh Barsanti, Gerry McGuire
- Ward 3 — William Syms, Robert DeFazio
- Ward 4 — Nick Trbovich, Mike Sanzosti
- Ward 5 — Walter Chisholm, Art Gualazzi
- Ward 6 — Frank Manzo, Robert Gernon

=== 1975-1976 Council ===
Council elected in the December 2, 1974 municipal election.

- Mayor — Nick Trbovich
- Ward 1 — Tom Angus, William Hrynuik
- Ward 2 — Russ Ramsay, Gerry McGuire
- Ward 3 — William Syms, Walter Borowicz
- Ward 4 — Robert Collins, Mike Sanzosti
- Ward 5 — Walter Chisholm, Art Gualazzi
- Ward 6 — Frank Manzo, Robert Gernon

=== 1977-1978 Council ===
Council elected in the December 6, 1976 municipal election.

- Mayor — Nick Trbovich
- Ward 1 — Tom Angus, William Hrynuik
- Ward 2 — Curt Broadwell, Marsh Barsanti
- Ward 3 — William Syms, Walter Borowicz
- Ward 4 — Mike Sanzosti, John Ferris
- Ward 5 — Walter Chisholm, Art Gualazzi
- Ward 6 — Frank Manzo, Joe Fratesi

=== 1978-1980 Council ===
Council elected in the November 13, 1978 municipal election. The provincial government had changed the municipal election date from the first Monday in December to the second Monday in November and required that councils hold their inaugural meeting in mid December.

- Mayor — Nick Trbovich
- Ward 1 — Tom Angus, Charlie Swift
- Ward 2 — Don Macgregor, Marsh Barsanti
- Ward 3 — William Syms, Walter Borowicz
- Ward 4 — Mike Sanzosti, Fred Dovigi
- Ward 5 — Art Gualazzi, Victor Gardi
- Ward 6 — Frank Manzo, Joe Fratesi

=== 1980-1982 Council ===
Council elected in the November 10, 1980 municipal election.

- Mayor — Don Macgregor
- Ward 1 — Steve Butland, Charlie Swift
- Ward 2 — Tom Angus, Marsh Barsanti
- Ward 3 — Walter Borowicz, Bill Syms
- Ward 4 — Fred Dovigi, Mike Sanzosti
- Ward 5 — Walter Chisholm, Art Gualazzi
- Ward 6 — Frank Manzo, Joe Fratesi

=== 1982-1985 Council ===
Council elected in the November 8, 1982 municipal election.

- Mayor — Don Macgregor
- Ward 1 — Steve Butland, Charlie Swift
- Ward 2 — Tom Angus, Tom Gillespie
- Ward 3 — Bill Syms, Walter Borowicz
- Ward 4 — Fred Dovigi, Mike Sanzosti
- Ward 5 — Walter Chisholm, Vic Gardi
- Ward 6 — Frank Manzo, Gary Trembinski

=== 1985-1988 Council ===
Council elected in the November 14, 1985 municipal election.

- Mayor — Joe Fratesi
- Ward 1 — Steve Butland, Charlie Swift
- Ward 2 — Tom Angus, Tom Gillespie
- Ward 3 — Harry Hurdon, Walter Borowicz
- Ward 4 — Mike Sanzosti, Dennis Nelson
- Ward 5 — Walter Chisholm, Vic Gardi
- Ward 6 — Frank Manzo, Joan DesJardins

=== 1988-1991 Council ===
Council elected in the November 14, 1988 municipal election.

- Mayor — Joe Fratesi
- Ward 1 — Jack Moore, Charlie Swift
- Ward 2 — Tom Angus, Udo Rauk
- Ward 3 — Harry Hurdon, John Solski
- Ward 4 — Mike Sanzosti, Rick Niro
- Ward 5 — Walter Chisholm, Vic Gardi
- Ward 6 — Frank Manzo, Ed Szcepanik

=== 1991-1994 Council ===
Council elected in the November 12, 1991 municipal election.

- Mayor — Joe Fratesi
- Ward 1 — Charlie Swift, Jack Moore
- Ward 2 — Udo Rauk, Jack Cameletti
- Ward 3 — John Solski, Mary Borowicz
- Ward 4 — Mike Sanzosti, Rick Niro
- Ward 5 — Wayne DeLuca, Walter Chisholm
- Ward 6 — Ed Szcepanik, Frank Manzo

=== 1994-1997 Council ===
Council elected in the November 14, 1994 municipal election.

- Mayor — Joe Fratesi^{ᛡ}
- Ward 1 — Jack Moore, Charlie Swift
- Ward 2 — Udo Rauk, Jack Cameletti
- Ward 3 — Mary Borowicz, John Solski
- Ward 4 — Rick Niro, Mike Sanzosti
- Ward 5 — Walter Chisholm, Wayne DeLuca
- Ward 6 — Gary Trembinski, Ed Szcepanik

^{ᛡ} Steve Butland was elected in a May 2, 1996 by-election to succeed Joe Fratesi who had been named the city's chief administrative officer.

=== 1997-2000 Council ===
Council elected in the November 10, 1997 municipal election.

- Mayor — Steve Butland
- Ward 1 — David Orazietti, Charlie Swift
- Ward 2 — Brady Irwin, Jody Curran
- Ward 3 — Derik Brandt, Mary Borowicz
- Ward 4 — Sam Lepore, Rick Niro
- Ward 5 — Debbie Amaroso, Duane Jones
- Ward 6 — Peter Vaudry, Mary Pascuzzi

=== 2000-2003 Council ===
Council elected in the November 13, 2000 municipal election.

- Mayor — John Rowswell
- Ward 1 — David Orazietti^{ᛡᛡ}, James Caicco
- Ward 2 — Tony Ryma, Brady Irwin
- Ward 3 — Pat Mick, Derik Brandt
- Ward 4 — Neil DelBianco, Lou Turco
- Ward 5 — Debbie Amaroso, Duane Jones
- Ward 6 — Peter Vaudry, Tom Austin^{ᛡ}

^{ᛡ} Frank Manzo was elected in a December 13, 2001 by-election to succeed Tom Austin who died on September 21, 2001.
^{ᛡᛡ} David Orazietti resigned upon his election to the provincial legislature in October 2003. His seat remained vacant until the municipal election that November.

=== 2003-2006 Council ===
Council elected in the November 10, 2003 municipal election.

- Mayor — John Rowswell
- Ward 1 — Steve Butland, James Caicco
- Ward 2 — Terry Sheehan, Jody Curran
- Ward 3 — Bryan Hayes, Pat Mick
- Ward 4 — Neil DelBianco, Lou Turco
- Ward 5 — David Celetti, Debbie Amaroso
- Ward 6 — Jason Collins, Frank Manzo

=== 2006-2010 Council ===
Council elected in the November 13, 2006 municipal election. In 2006, mayors and councillors began to be elected to four year terms.

- Mayor — John Rowswell^{ᛡ}
- Ward 1 — Steve Butland, James Caicco
- Ward 2 — Susan Myers, Terry Sheehan
- Ward 3 — Bryan Hayes, Pat Mick
- Ward 4 — Lorena Tridico, Lou Turco
- Ward 5 — David Celetti, Frank Fata
- Ward 6 — Ozzie Grandinetti, Frank Manzo

^{ᛡ} Following Rowswell's death on August 31, 2010, three councillors served as acting mayor for the remainder of the term. Lorena Tridico was acting mayor in September; Susan Myers was acting mayor in October; and Ozzie Grandinetti was acting mayor in November.

=== 2010-2014 Council ===
Council elected in the 2010 municipal election:

- Mayor — Debbie Amaroso
- Ward 1 — Steve Butland, Paul Christian
- Ward 2 — Susan Myers, Terry Sheehan
- Ward 3 — Pat Mick, Brian Watkins
- Ward 4 — Rick Niro, Lou Turco
- Ward 5 — Marchy Bruni, Frank Fata
- Ward 6 — Joe Krmpotich, Frank Manzo

=== 2014–2018 Council ===
Council elected in the 2014 municipal election:

- Mayor — Christian Provenzano
- Ward 1 — Steve Butland, Paul Christian
- Ward 2 — Susan Myers, Terry Sheehan^{ᛡ}
- Ward 3 — Matthew Shoemaker, Judy Hupponen
- Ward 4 — Rick Niro, Lou Turco
- Ward 5 — Marchy Bruni, Frank Fata
- Ward 6 — Joe Krmpotich, Ross Romano^{ᛡᛡ}

^{ᛡ} Sandra Hollingsworth was elected in a February 1, 2016 by-election to succeed Terry Sheehan.
^{ᛡᛡ} Ozzie Grandinetti was appointed by council on June 26, 2017 to replace Ross Romano.

=== 2018–2022 Council ===
Council elected in the 2018 municipal election:

- Mayor — Christian Provenzano
- Ward 1 — Paul Christian, Sandra Hollingsworth
- Ward 2 — Luke Dufour, Lisa Vezeau-Allen
- Ward 3 — Donna Hilsinger, Matthew Shoemaker
- Ward 4 — Marchy Bruni, Rick Niro
- Ward 5 — Corey Gardi, Matthew Scott

=== 2022–2026 Council ===
Council elected in the 2022 municipal election:

- Mayor — Matthew Shoemaker
- Ward 1 — Sandra Hollingsworth, Sonny Spina
- Ward 2 — Luke Dufour, Lisa Vezeau-Allen
- Ward 3 — Angela Caputo, Ron Zagordo
- Ward 4 — Marchy Bruni, Stephan Kinach
- Ward 5 — Corey Gardi, Matthew Scott
