= List of mayors of Sault Ste. Marie, Ontario =

Mayors of the city of Sault Ste. Marie, Ontario

The mayor of Sault Ste. Marie, Ontario is the chief executive officer of the municipality. Those elected to the role preside over meetings of city council and are the primary spokesperson for the city and council. In addition, the mayor has certain powers under Part VI.1 of Ontario's Municipal Act, 2001 to direct the work of city staff and determine the organizational structure of city hall.

The mayor is the only office elected on a city-wide basis. Currently this election is conducted every four-years, at the same time as councillor elections, on a first-past-the-post basis.

== History ==
The city of Sault Ste. Marie has had 28 mayors since its incorporation.

Prior to becoming a city in 1912, Sault Ste. Marie had been a township governed by a council that included a mayor and six councillors elected at-large. Once incorporated as a city on April 16, 1912, the former town mayor William H. Munro became the first mayor of the new city. Munro and the city council governed the city until their terms ended early the following year.

Voters had the opportunity to elect their first mayor and city council in January 1913. Thomas E. Simpson and eight aldermen were elected at-large from across the city. At the time the mayor and council were elected to a one-year term with elections occurring each January.

The city's current mayor is Matthew Shoemaker, a former two-term city councillor, who was sworn in on November 15, 2022. Mayors currently serve a four-year term.

== Mayors ==
City incorporated on April 16, 1912
No.	Mayor	Took office	Left office	Prior political experience
1	William H. Munro	April 16, 1912	January 1913	Town councillor (1902-1903; 1905-1907; 1909-1910) Mayor, Town of Sault Ste. Marie (1911-1912)
2	Thomas Edward Simpson	January 1913	January 1915	Town councillor (1908); Mayor, Town of Sault Ste. Marie (1909-1910)
3	John Alexander McPhail	January 1915	January 1917	Town councillor (1911-1912) Alderman (1912-1914)
4	Francis Edward Crawford	January 1917	August 15, 1918 (resigned to become city assessor)	Town councillor (1912) Alderman (1912-1915)
5	Thomas Dean	August 15, 1918	January 1919	Councillor, Manitoulin Island; Reeve, St. Joseph Island; Town councillor (1905); Alderman (1914-1918)
6	George Alexander Boyd	1919	1919	
7	Thomas Farquhar	1920	1922	Secretary-treasurer, Public school board (1915-1926) Alderman (1918-1919)
8	James Dawson	1922	1925	
9	Thomas Joseph Irwin	1926	1929	
10	John McLarty	1930	1931	
11	James W. Lyons	1932	1934	Mayor of Steelton
12	Richard McMeekin	1935	1936	
13	W. John McMeeken	1937	1945	
14	William Henry Cecil Brien	1946	1949	
15	Charles Herbert Smale	1950	1956	
16	Walter Harry	1957	1959	
17	James L. McIntyre	January 1, 1960	January 11, 1965	Alderman, Ward 1 (1958-1959)

City amalgamates with Korah and Tarentorus townships on January 1, 1965
No.	Mayor	Took office	Left office	Prior political experience
18	Alexander C. Harry	January 11, 1965	January 13, 1969	
19	John Rhodes	January 13, 1969	November 8, 1971 (resigned to take provincial office)	Alderman, Ward 2 (1965-1968)
20	Ron Irwin	November 8, 1971	January 6, 1975	Alderman, Ward 1 (1969-1972)
21	Nicholas Trbovich	January 6, 1975	December 1, 1980	Alderman, Ward 4 (1971-1974)
22	Donald M. Macgregor	December 1, 1980	December 2, 1985	Alderman, Ward 2 (1978-1980)
23	Joe Fratesi	December 2, 1985	January 31, 1996 (resigned)	Alderman, Ward 5 (1977-1982)
24	Steve Butland	May 6, 1996	December 4, 2000	Alderman, Ward 1 (1980-1988); Member of Parliament (1988-1993)
25	John Rowswell	December 4, 2000	August 31, 2010 (died in office)	
26	Debbie Amaroso	December 1, 2010	November 30, 2014	Councillor, Ward 5 (1997-2006)
27	Christian Provenzano	December 1, 2014	November 30, 2022	
28	Matthew Shoemaker	November 30, 2022	Present	Councillor, Ward 3 (2018-2022)
