= Steve Butland =

Canadian politician (1941–2025)

Sault Ste. Marie Alderman, Ward One
- In office 1980–1988

MP for Sault Ste. Marie
- In office 1988–1993
- Preceded by: James Kelleher
- Succeeded by: Ron Irwin

Mayor of Sault Ste. Marie
- In office 1996–2000
- Preceded by: Michael Sanzosti (interim)
- Succeeded by: John Rowswell

Sault Ste. Marie Councillor, Ward One
- In office December 1, 2003 – November 30, 2018

Personal details
- Born: Stephen Ernest Joseph Butland; March 26, 1941 Sault Ste. Marie, Ontario, Canada
- Died: October 15, 2025 (aged 84)
- Party: New Democratic Party
- Spouse: Sharran Misner
- Children: 3
- Education: Laurentian University; Northern Michigan University
- Occupation: Teacher

Stephen Ernest Joseph Butland (March 26, 1941 – October 15, 2025) was a Canadian politician. One of Sault Ste. Marie's longest serving representatives, he was elected to municipal and federal offices for over 30 years.

He represented the Sault Ste. Marie electoral district in the House of Commons from 1988 to 1993 as a member of the New Democratic Party. He served as mayor of Sault Ste. Marie from 1996 to 2000, and as a city councillor from 1980 to 1988 and 2003 to 2018.

== Early life and career ==
Butland was born in Sault Ste. Marie, Ontario on March 26, 1941, the only child of Beatrice Paquette and Henry Seymour Butland, a mechanic who had emigrated from England in the 1920s.

He received his early education at William Merrifield Public School and Sault Collegiate Institute secondary school. He received a bachelor's degree from Laurentian University and a master's degree in education from Northern Michigan University.

Having no training in broadcasting, in the early 1970s, he briefly hosted a late-night sports program on local CJIC-TV, that he later described as “so bad.”

Prior to entering federal politics, he worked as a school teacher and principal for 26 years in the Catholic separate school system. His first teaching job was at St. Mary's High School teaching the children of recent immigrants when he was not yet in his 20s. “Half of my class were 16 years old, and I guess I was 19 and a little bit. About a third of them did not speak a word of English. The vast majority were from Italy ... I was no more ready to be a teacher after I graduated than I was to be a plumber. Within three or four years, I started to enjoy teaching.”

In June 1966 he was appointed vice principal at Sacred Heart Catholic School and had the same role at St. Theresa School.

He also served as district president of the Sault English Catholic Teachers Association. In this role he advocated for better pay for teachers and for teachers to be excluded from the federal unemployment insurance program.

He was later appointed principal of Holy Family Separate School and other schools in the Catholic elementary school system.

In the 1970s, he took a one-year sabbatical and spent four months teaching on Pohnpei, a Pacific island in the eastern Caroline Islands. This experience directly contributed to his decision to get involved in public service, later saying, “I learned that Canada is the best country in the world and I’ll give back to the country. I thought maybe I could go into the political world.”

== Municipal politics (1980–1988) ==
A hard-working campaigner, Butland knocked on over 4,000 doors to win his first election to Sault Ste. Marie city council in the 1980 municipal election. He garnered the most votes against three other challengers including an incumbent councillor to represent the city's east-end Ward 1. He was re-elected in 1982 and 1985.

== Federal politics (1988–1993) ==
In April 1988, Butland announced that he would seek the New Democratic Party's nomination for the Sault Ste. Marie riding for that year's federal election. At the time, he had been a member of the party's local association executive for five years. The Canada-US free trade agreement factored heavily in Sault Ste. Marie. Butland argued that agreement would be “a first step in the demise of Canada.” He also campaigned for direct and sustained federal investment, instead of occasional grants, to create employment opportunities particularly for young people in the region.

He faced off against the incumbent Progressive Conservative MP and then-solicitor general Jim Kelleher. Despite the Progressive Conservatives being re-elected to a majority government, Butland managed to defeat Kelleher by a 1,060 vote margin with 35.3 per cent of the vote. Butland's win was one of only two ridings where a cabinet minister had been defeated and some community leaders expressed concern that the loss of a seat at cabinet would hurt the community.

In parliament, he served as the NDP's critic for public works and municipal affairs. He advocated for the federal government to repair the locks at Sault Ste. Marie so Canadian traffic on the Great Lakes would not become solely dependant on the US locks. He was critical of increases in public spending on advertising that occurred under the Mulroney government.

In early 1990, when the Sault Ste. Marie language resolution controversy had divided the community and was threatening to further exacerbate national unity concerns, Butland warned other politicians to avoid exploiting the matter for their own political advantage. He told the House of Commons, "Yes, we have problems in my community. Yes. there is divisiveness. Yes, there is tension. Outside interference from whatever source or side at this point is not helpful and will only aggravate tensions."

Butland faced a difficult path to re-election in 1993. The recession of the early 1990s had hit employment in Ontario and Sault Ste. Marie particularly hard, dragging down the popularity of the provincial NDP government that had been elected two years earlier. On top of this, a nation-wide sentiment that it was time for a change at the federal level worked to the advantage of the opposition Liberal Party. Butland lost re-election to Liberal candidate and former mayor Ron Irwin by 12,437 votes.

Butland was discouraged by the loss. Reflecting years later he said “I was successful many more times than I was unsuccessful and it’s much easier to deal with when you’re the winner. The first time I lost I had a hard time and I thought ‘this is tough’.”

== Municipal politics (1996–2018) ==
=== Mayor (1996–2000) ===
It was not long before Butland was persuaded to run for office again. Butland was urged to run for mayor of Sault Ste. Marie following the controversial appointment of then-mayor Joe Fratesi to the city’s top staff job.

He was elected in a May 2, 1996 by-election, attracting over 63 per cent of the vote and far outpacing four challengers, including former provincial cabinet minister Russ Ramsay. He described the victory as “a bit of redemption for me” following his 1993 defeat. “I lost in a landslide a few years ago, so personally I feel somewhat vindicated.”

He told reporters that he aspired to no other political office and planned to bring an “inclusive style of leadership” to city hall and a “very positive, positive next three months.”

He served as mayor for the 18 months remaining in the council's term and was re-elected in the 1997 municipal election.

Four years later however, Butland faced an uneasy path to re-election. The controversy around Fratesi's appointment to the city's chief administrator job continued to dog council with many voters still deeply disappointed that Butland had not removed him from the role.

He lost re-election to John Rowswell, an engineer who had not served in any public office and had campaigned on a change message that earned him a 2,000 vote margin over Butland.

At his last council meeting as mayor, Butland urged the in-coming council to pursue positive initiatives and put the chief administrative officer issue behind it. “Let us not fall victim to secret agendas and don’t revisit old issues that will bring nothing but dismay and controversy to the community … Don’t fall victim to other people’s agendas. They are nothing more than vengeance and that is counterproductive.”

=== City Councillor (2003–2018) ===
In 2003, Butland announced a return to municipal politics. He would run for a seat in Ward 1, the same ward he had represented from 1980 to 1988, in that year's municipal election. He was elected, garnering the most votes in a field of five candidates. He was subsequently re-elected by his constituents in 2006, 2010 and 2014.

At the age of 77, Butland opted not to re-offer in the 2018 municipal election.

He considered bringing indoor soccer to the Northern Community Centre, the creation of the Sault Ste. Marie Innovation Centre, and his work promoting solar and alternative energy, including pushing for a resolution to declare the city the Alternative Energy Capital of North America as his principal accomplishments in municipal politics.

In recognition of his long service, in 2018 he was awarded the Medal of Merit, the city's highest honour, and in 2025 was given the key to the city.

== Personal life ==
On August 8, 1964, Butland wed Sharran Misner at St. Gregory's Church in Sault Ste. Marie. The couple had three daughters, Stefanie, Suzanne and Stacy.

In late October 2014, Butland admitted to having made an "unforgivable" decision that resulted in a conviction and the loss of his driver's licence. That March, he had been driving home through Michigan from visiting with his daughter in Sarnia, Ontario. He had been experiencing severe back pain diagnosed as compressed disks and vertebra in his neck. To relieve his pain on the long drive he had taken "two strong shots" of whisky. Pulled over for speeding, he was charged and ultimately convicted of being "visibly impaired." Due to a reciprocal agreement between Michigan and Ontario, his licence was suspended for a year. Stressing that he didn't have a drinking problem, Butland was contrite in his description of the incident to the reporters. "It was one night where I made a major, major error and I am extremely humiliated."

== Death and tributes ==
Butland died on October 15, 2025, at the age of 84.

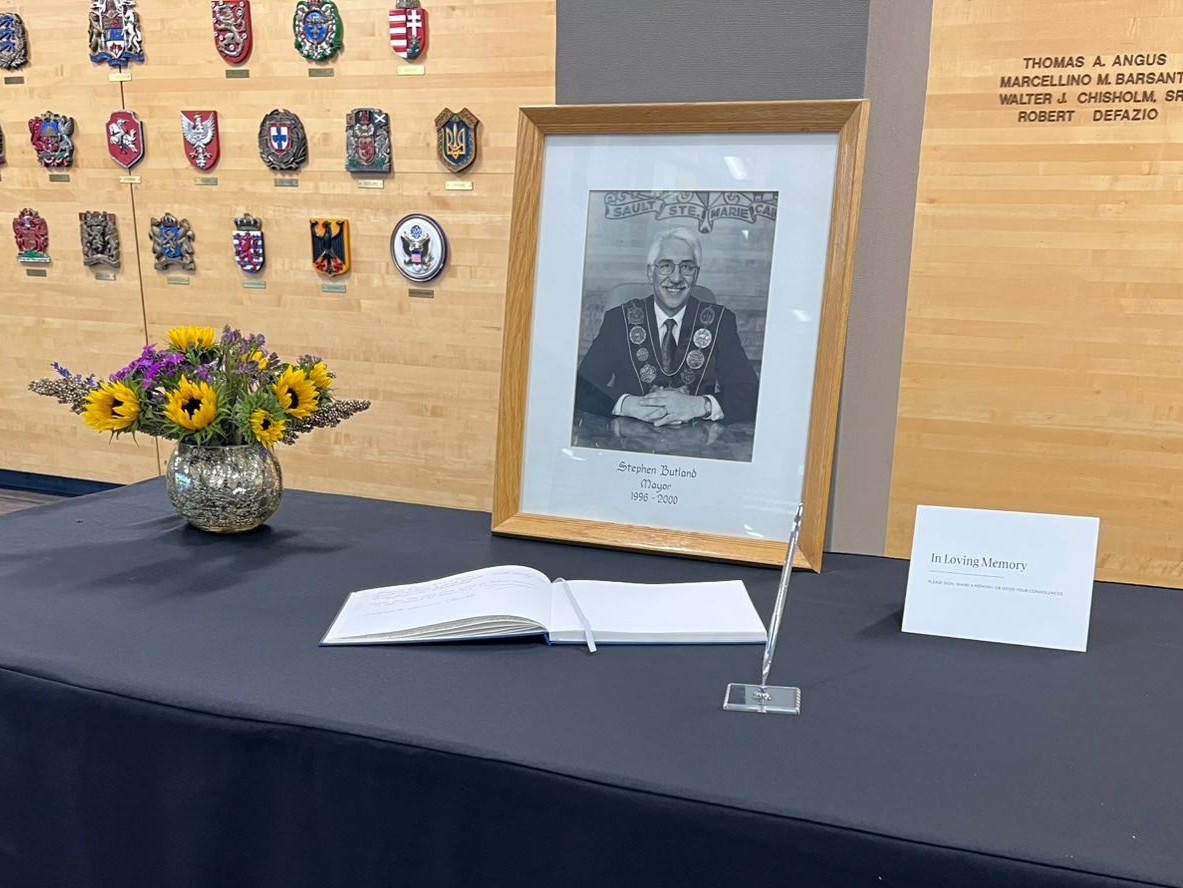
Book of condolences honouring Steve Butland, former MP, mayor and city councillor at Sault Ste. Marie City Hall on October 25, 2025

News of his death was first shared on October 21 through an email sent to city staff by the city's chief administrative officer which was later reported in the media.

In the obituary that followed, his family announced that his remains had been cremated and would be interred alongside his parents at Holy Sepulchre Cemetery in March 2026, on what would have been his 85th birthday.

City mayor Mathew Shoemaker praised Butland's reputation as a public figure. “It’s rare in public life for someone to serve as long as Steve did and still be held in such high regard by so many – a true testament to the respect he earned and the way he carried himself.”

Former NDP MPP Bud Wildman spoke about his friend's positivity saying, “He always had a positive outlook … He was an optimist and really believed that people could work together to solve problems.”

Terry Sheehan, who had served on council with Butland and been mentored by him when he became a member of Parliament lauded his character. “He was a person who knew when to lead and knew when to follow. He was just a fantastic person all around.”

Joe Fratesi, the former mayor and city's chief administrative officer praised Butland's reliability and focus on citizens. “I enjoyed working with Steve. You could always count on him and he made sure the ordinary person was looked after and their basic needs were looked after.”

== Electoral record ==
=== Municipal ===
1980 Sault Ste. Marie election Alderman, Ward One (two members elected)
Candidate	Total votes	Elected
Steve Butland	2,845	x
Charlie Swift (i)	2,753	x
Bill Hrynuik	2,632	
Tim Thibault	978	

1982 Sault Ste. Marie election Alderman, Ward One (two members elected)
Candidate	Total votes	Elected
Steve Butland (i)	3,787	x
Charlie Swift (i)	2,587	x
Jack Moore	2,447	
Albert Ferranti	1,854	
Tim Thibault	1,786	

1985 Sault Ste. Marie election Alderman, Ward One (two members elected)
Candidate	Total votes	Elected
Steve Butland (i)	4,761	x
Charlie Swift (i)	3,778	x
Jack Moore	3,632	

=== Federal ===
1988 Canadian federal election
Party	Candidate	Votes	%	±%
New Democratic	Steve Butland	14,595	35.28	+3.76
Progressive Conservative	Jim Kelleher	13,533	32.72	-5.88
Liberal	Joe Sniezek	13,237	32.00	+2.70
Total		41,365	100.00	

1993 Canadian federal election
Party	Candidate	Votes	%	±%
Liberal	Ron Irwin	21,407	52.91	+20.91
New Democratic	Steve Butland	8,970	22.17	-13.11
Reform	Paul Mathewson	6,566	16.23	+16.23
Progressive Conservative	Gerry Nori	3,152	7.79	-24.93
National	Henry A. Roess	209	0.52	
Natural Law	Chris Evans	155	0.38	
Total		40,459	100.00	

=== Municipal ===
1996 Sault Ste. Marie mayoral by- election: Mayor of Sault Ste. Marie
Candidate	Votes	%
Steve Butland	23,194	63.45
Russ Ramsay	10,347	28.30
Maureen Sullivan	1,895	5.18
Robin Thibault	637	1.74
Lois Beckett	484	1.32
Total valid votes	36,557	100.00

1997 Sault Ste. Marie election: Mayor of Sault Ste. Marie
Candidate	Votes	%
Steve Butland (i)	19,312	55.22
Udo Rauk	11,197	32.02
Gerry Bell	2,026	5.79
Frank Manzo	1,770	5.06
Tim MacIntyre	669	1.91
Total valid votes	34,947	100.00

2000 Sault Ste. Marie election: Mayor of Sault Ste. Marie
Candidate	Votes	%
John Rowswell	17,985	53.44
Steve Butland (i)	15,672	46.56
Total valid votes	33,657	100.00

2003 Sault Ste. Marie election Councillor, Ward One (two members elected)
Candidate	Total votes	Elected
Steve Butland	3,535	x
James Caicco	3,273	x
Paul Christian	1,706	
Daniel Lewis	982	
Andy Martens	474	

2006 Sault Ste. Marie election Councillor, Ward One (two members elected)
Candidate	Total votes	Elected
Steve Butland (i)	4,003	x
James Caicco (i)	3,697	x
John Borho	1,198	
Andy Martens	708	

2010 Sault Ste. Marie election Councillor, Ward One (two members elected)
Candidate	Total votes	Elected
Steve Butland (i)	3,910	x
Paul Christian	2,854	x
Mac Headrick	2,329	

2014 Sault Ste. Marie election Councillor, Ward One (two members elected)
Candidate	Total votes	Elected
Steve Butland (i)	3,088	x
Paul Christian (i)	2,841	x
Derek Crowell	1,291	
Andy Martens	989	
Rick Turco	449	
Christopher Newman	138	
