= Fratesi =

Fratesi is a surname. Notable people with the surname include:

- Jennifer Fratesi (born 1984), Canadian swimmer
- Joe Fratesi, Canadian politician

== See also ==
- Davide Frattesi (born 1999), Italian footballer
