= Alliance for the Preservation of English in Canada =

Canadian anti-bilingualism organization

The Alliance for the Preservation of English in Canada (APEC) was a group in Canada, which campaigned against the Canadian government's policy of official bilingualism.

The group was formed in 1977 by Irene Hilchie, a government employee who felt that she was being discriminated against in her job because she did not speak French. The group's most famous member, however, was Jock V. Andrew, whose book Bilingual Today, French Tomorrow alleged that bilingualism was part of a government plot to make Canada a unilingually French country.

The group was most influential in the late 1980s, as it engaged in activities which contributed to the defeat of the Meech Lake Accord. As well, the group was involved in a campaign to have Ontario municipalities declare themselves English-only, in response to the Ontario government's French Language Services Act. While the act did not apply to municipal government services, APEC represented it as a slippery slope towards such a requirement to convince municipalities to pass English-only resolutions.

Most famously, the city of Sault Ste. Marie passed such a resolution on January 29, 1990. Quebec voters perceived the Sault Ste. Marie resolution and the Brockville flag incident as symbols of English Canada's feelings toward Quebec, and the incidents contributed to the resurgence of the Quebec sovereignty movement in the 1990s and thus to the 1995 Quebec referendum.

APEC also worked closely with the Confederation of Regions Party and the Reform Party, two political parties which held similar views about bilingualism and the role of Quebec in Confederation.

APEC claims to be not anti-French, but believes that tax money was being wastefully used in the promotion of official bilingualism in Canada.

In February 2000, the organization moved its head office to Toronto, and changed its name to Canadians Against Bilingualism Injustice (CABI). In 2001, the organization changed its name again, becoming the Canadian Network for Language Awareness.

In the 2000 federal election, CABI spent just over $150,000 as a registered third party participant. Most of the funds were used to place advertisements in Ontario newspapers. No such participation has been recorded for subsequent elections.

For years, APEC / CABI owned the domain name www.bilingualism.org, but registration lapsed some time between 2000 and 2010.
