= Cyril Symes =

Canadian politician (born 1943)

Reginald Cyril Symes

Member of Parliament for Sault Ste. Marie
- In office October 30, 1972 – February 17, 1980
- Preceded by: Terrence Murphy
- Succeeded by: Ron Irwin

Personal details
- Born: April 30, 1943 (age 82) Fort William, Ontario, Canada
- Party: New Democratic Party

Reginald Cyril Symes (born April 30, 1943) is a former Canadian politician. He represented the electoral district of Sault Ste. Marie in the House of Commons of Canada from 1972 to 1980. He was a member of the New Democratic Party.

Symes was defeated in the 1980 election by Ron Irwin.

== Election results ==
1980 Canadian federal election: Sault Ste. Marie
Party	Candidate	Votes	%	±%
Liberal	Ron Irwin	15,449	47.96	+12.29
New Democratic	Cyril Symes	12,542	38.94	+1.68
Progressive Conservative	Penny Hanson	4,161	12.92	-13.79
Marxist–Leninist	Mike Taffarel	59	0.18	+0.06
Total		32,211	100.00	

1979 Canadian federal election: Sault Ste. Marie
Party	Candidate	Votes	%	±%
New Democratic	Cyril Symes	12,089	37.26	-13.24
Liberal	Terry Murphy	11,574	35.67	-5.41
Progressive Conservative	Gord Cunningham	8,668	26.71	+18.49
Communist	Richard Orlandini	79	0.24	+0.04
Marxist–Leninist	Mike Taffarel	38	0.12	
Total		32,448	100.00	

1974 Canadian federal election: Sault Ste. Marie
Party	Candidate	Votes	%	±%
New Democratic	Cyril Symes	19,044	50.50	+13.79
Liberal	Alex Sinclair	15,490	41.08	+5.12
Progressive Conservative	Bob de Fazio	3,098	8.22	-19.10
Communist	Gerrit van Houten	76	0.20	
Total		37,708	100.00	

1972 Canadian federal election: Sault Ste. Marie
Party	Candidate	Votes	%	±%
New Democratic	Cyril Symes	12,903	36.71	+13.51
Liberal	C. Terrence Murphy	12,639	35.96	-3.87
Progressive Conservative	L.B. Lou Lukenda	9,603	27.32	-9.34
Total		35,145	100.00	
