= John Rowswell =

Mayor of Sault Ste. Marie
- In office 2000–2010
- Preceded by: Steve Butland
- Succeeded by: Lorena Tridico (interim)

Personal details
- Born: May 18, 1955
- Died: August 31, 2010 (aged 55)
- Occupation: civil engineer

John Rowswell (May 18, 1955 – August 31, 2010) was a Canadian politician who served as the mayor of Sault Ste. Marie, Ontario from 2000 to 2010. He was first elected in the 2000 municipal election, defeating Steve Butland, and in 2006 he was re-elected for his third term with approximately 56.5% of the vote. He was a consulting engineer who operated his own company, Rowswell & Associates Engineers Ltd. He was one of the longest-serving mayors in the city's history; only Joe Fratesi served as mayor of Sault Ste. Marie for longer than Rowswell.

One of his final significant acts as mayor was to issue a formal apology to French Canadians for the Sault Ste. Marie language resolution of 1990, which had occurred before his time on council.

He died in office on August 31, 2010, after a prolonged battle with cancer. Rowswell had a private funeral, although a public wake was held at the city's Essar Centre. The city's 2010 Terry Fox Run was also dedicated to Rowswell's memory.

As his death occurred less than two months before the 2010 municipal election, provincial law did not permit a by-election to be held to choose his immediate successor. City council opted not to appoint an interim replacement, but instead followed its existing rotation of acting mayors that had been arranged to serve as mayor during his medical absences. Councillors Lorena Tridico, Susan Myers and Ozzie Grandinetti each served one month as acting mayor until Debbie Amaroso, the winner of the 2010 election and runner-up to Rowswell in 2006, took office on December 1.

== Electoral record ==
2003 Sault Ste. Marie municipal election: Mayor of Sault Ste. Marie
Candidate	Votes	%
John Rowswell	11,713	41.68
Peter Vaudry	8,579	30.52
Patricia Jennings	7,000	24.91
Gary Bedryk	812	2.89
Total valid votes	28,104	100.00

2006 Sault Ste. Marie municipal election: Mayor of Sault Ste. Marie
Candidate	Votes	%
John Rowswell	15,932	56.47
Debbie Amaroso	8,460	29.98
Fred Dovigi	3,822	13.55
Total valid votes	28,214	100.00
