= Bryan Hayes =

Canadian politician

Member of Parliament for Sault Ste. Marie
- In office May 2, 2011 – October 19, 2015
- Preceded by: Tony Martin
- Succeeded by: Terry Sheehan

Sault Ste. Marie City Councillor
- In office December 1, 2003 – December 1, 2010
- Preceded by: Derik Brandt
- Succeeded by: Brian Watkins
- Constituency: Ward 3

Personal details
- Born: October 8, 1958 (age 67) Marville, France
- Party: Conservative Party of Canada
- Spouse: Aida Hayes
- Children: 2
- Profession: businessman, city councillor

Bryan Hayes (born October 8, 1958) is a Canadian politician who served as the member of Parliament for the riding of Sault Ste. Marie from 2011 to 2015 as a member of the Conservative Party of Canada. Prior to entering federal politics, he served on the Sault Ste. Marie City Council from 2003 to 2010, representing Ward 3.

== Background ==
Hayes was born October 8, 1958, in Marville, France, where his father was stationed as a member of the Canadian Armed Forces. He graduated with honours from the marketing program at Cambrian College. Hayes also holds a degree in accounting from Laurentian University and completed his Certified General Accountanting designation.

== Political career ==
Hayes served on Sault Ste. Marie City Council from 2003 to 2010, and was an active participant on many boards, including the District Social Services Administration Board, the Sault and Area Hospital Board of Directors, and the Sault Ste. Marie Downtown Association.

Hayes was elected to the House of Commons of Canada as a member of the Conservative Party of Canada in the 2011 federal election, representing the riding of Sault Ste. Marie. He defeated NDP incumbent Tony Martin, becoming the first Conservative candidate to win the riding since the 1984 election. He ran for re-election in the 2015 election, but was defeated by Liberal candidate Terry Sheehan.

== Personal life ==
Hayes and his wife, Aida, have two children.

== Electoral record ==
2015 Canadian federal election: Sault Ste. Marie
Party	Candidate	Votes	%	±%	Expenditures
Liberal	Terry Sheehan	19,582	44.75	+25.02	$59,074.57
Conservative	Bryan Hayes	13,615	31.12	–9.28	$114,243.06
New Democratic	Skip Morrison	9,543	21.81	–15.63	$63,747.71
Green	Kara Flannigan	934	2.13	+0.04	$127.42
Marxist–Leninist	Mike Taffarel	83	0.19	+0.10	-
Total valid votes/Expense limit		43,757	100.0		$198,539.65
Total rejected ballots		200	0.45	–0.06	
Turnout		43,957	69.16	+4.97	
Eligible voters		63,555			
Liberal gain from Conservative		Swing		+17.15	
Source: Elections Canada

2011 Canadian federal election: Sault Ste. Marie
Party	Candidate	Votes	%	±%	Expenditures
Conservative	Bryan Hayes	18,328	41.14	+3.72	$80,142.96
New Democratic	Tony Martin	16,467	37.23	-3.20	$81,906.09
Liberal	Christian Provenzano	8,343	18.86	+2.10	$63,159.73
Green	Luke MacMichael	945	2.14	-2.19	$3,129.72
Christian Heritage	Randy Riauka	111	0.25	–	$105.54
Marxist–Leninist	Mike Taffarel	38	0.09	-0.11	none listed
Total valid votes/Expense limit		44,232	100.0		$86,404.40
Total rejected, unmarked and declined ballots		228	0.51	+0.11	
Turnout		44,460	64.19	+4.77	
Eligible voters		69,259			
Conservative gain from New Democratic		Swing		+3.46	
