= Bilingual Today, French Tomorrow =

1977 book by Jock V. Andrew

- First edition
- Author: James Vernon "Jock" Andrew
- Publisher: BMG Publishing
- Publication date: 1977
- Publication place: Canada

Bilingual Today, French Tomorrow: Trudeau's Master Plan and How it Can be Stopped was a controversial 1977 book by James Vernon "Jock" Andrew (1929–2020), a retired Canadian naval officer. It alleged that the prime minister Pierre Trudeau's policy of official bilingualism was a plot to make Canada a unilingually francophone country, by instituting reverse discrimination against Anglophone Canadians.

The book inspired the formation of the lobby group Alliance for the Preservation of English in Canada.

== See also ==
- Le Livre noir du Canada anglais
