= Sault Ste. Marie—Algoma =

Federal electoral district in Ontario, Canada

Coordinates: 47.033°N 84.452°W

Ontario electoral district
- Interactive map of riding boundaries from the 2025 federal election

Federal electoral district
- Legislature: House of Commons
MP
Terry Sheehan
Liberal
- District created: 1966
- First contested: 1968
- Last contested: 2025
- District webpage: profile, map

Demographics
- Population (2011): 82,052
- Electors (2015): 63,555
- Area (km²): 5,921
- Pop. density (per km²): 13.9
- Census division(s): Algoma, Sudbury
- Census subdivision(s): Sault Ste. Marie, Elliot Lake, Blind River, Wawa, Huron Shores, Macdonald, Meredith and Aberdeen Additional, St. Joseph, Thessalon, Laird, Sagamok

Sault Ste. Marie—Algoma (formerly Sault Ste. Marie) is a federal electoral district in Ontario, Canada, that has been represented in the House of Commons of Canada since 1968.

This riding was centred on the city of Sault Ste. Marie since its creation from Algoma West in 1966. Under the 2022 Canadian federal electoral redistribution the riding gained most of rural Algoma from Algoma—Manitoulin—Kapuskasing, and was renamed Sault Ste. Marie—Algoma.

== Riding history ==
The riding was created in 1966 from parts of Algoma West riding. For most of its history, the riding included only the city of Sault Ste. Marie and some immediately surrounding communities.

It consisted initially of the City of Sault Ste. Marie and the Township of Prince. In 1976, it was redefined to consist of the part of the City of Sault Ste. Marie east of Allen's Side Road and south of the Second Line.

In 1987, it was redefined to consist of the part of the City of Sault Ste. Marie lying south of Third Line and the part of Rankin Location 15D lying within the city limits.

In 1996, it was redefined to consist of the City of Sault Ste. Marie.

=== 2015–2025 boundaries ===
In the 2012 federal electoral redistribution, this riding was redefined, losing St. Joseph Island, Macdonald, Meredith and Aberdeen Additional, Laird, Tarbutt, Johnson, Plummer Additional, Bruce Mines and a portion of Unorganized North Algoma to Algoma—Manitoulin—Kapuskasing. It was then defined as:

"Consisting of that part of the Territorial District of Algoma described as follows: commencing at the intersection of the international boundary between Canada and the United States of America with the southeasterly corner of the Territorial District of Thunder Bay; thence N45°00'E in a straight line to the intersection of the northern shoreline of Lake Superior with the northerly boundary of the geographic Township of Peever; thence easterly along the northerly boundary of the geographic townships of Peever and Home to the Montreal River; thence generally easterly along said river to the easterly limit of the Territorial District of Algoma; thence southerly and easterly along the limit of said territorial district to the easterly boundary of the geographic Township of Bracci; thence southerly along said boundary and the easterly boundary of the geographic townships of Gaudry, Nahwegezhic, Lamming, Hughes, Curtis, Gillmor and McMahon to the northerly boundary of the geographic Township of Aberdeen; thence westerly along said boundary to the northerly limit of the Township of MacDonald, Meredith and Aberdeen Additional; thence generally westerly along said limit to the international boundary between Canada and the United States of America; thence generally westerly and northwesterly along said boundary to the point of commencement."

=== Current boundaries ===
After the 2022 Canadian federal electoral redistribution taking effect at the 2025 election, this riding was greatly expanded, taking most of rural Algoma District from Algoma—Manitoulin—Kapuskasing, and was renamed Sault Ste. Marie—Algoma. As of the 2025 election, it consists of: the cities of Elliot Lake and Sault Ste. Marie, the towns of Blind River, Bruce Mines, Spanish, and Thessalon, as well as the municipalities of Huron Shores and Wawa. It also covers several townships, such as Dubreuilville, Hilton, and White River, and the village of Hilton Beach. Additionally, it includes the Unorganized South East and North Algoma Districts, with a specific exclusion in North Algoma.

== Demographics ==
According to the 2021 Canadian census

Ethnic groups: 81.0% White, 14.9% Indigenous, 1.5% South Asian

Languages: 87.5% English, 3.2% Italian, 2.9% French

Religions: 58.1% Christian (32.3% Catholic, 6.1% United Church, 4.8% Anglican, 1.6% Lutheran, 1.5% Baptist, 1.2% Presbyterian, 10.6% other), 39.2% none

Median income: $40,800 (2020)

Average income: $49,640 (2020)

== Members of Parliament ==
This riding has elected the following members of Parliament:

Parliament	Years	Member	Party
Sault Ste. Marie; Riding created from Algoma West
28th	1968–1972	Terrence Murphy	Liberal
29th	1972–1974	Cyril Symes	New Democratic
30th	1974–1979	Cyril Symes	New Democratic
31st	1979–1980	Cyril Symes	New Democratic
32nd	1980–1984	Ron Irwin	Liberal
33rd	1984–1988	James Kelleher	Progressive Conservative
34th	1988–1993	Steve Butland	New Democratic
35th	1993–1997	Ron Irwin	Liberal
36th	1997–2000	Carmen Provenzano	Liberal
37th	2000–2004	Carmen Provenzano	Liberal
38th	2004–2006	Tony Martin	New Democratic
39th	2006–2008	Tony Martin	New Democratic
40th	2008–2011	Tony Martin	New Democratic
41st	2011–2015	Bryan Hayes	Conservative
42nd	2015–2019	Terry Sheehan	Liberal
43rd	2019–2021	Terry Sheehan	Liberal
44th	2021–2025	Terry Sheehan	Liberal
Sault Ste. Marie—Algoma incorporating parts of Algoma—Manitoulin—Kapuskasing
45th	2025–present	Terry Sheehan	Liberal

== Election results ==
Graph of election results in Sault Ste. Marie (minor parties that never got 2% of the vote or didn't run consistently are omitted)

=== Sault Ste. Marie—Algoma, 2023 representation order ===
2025 Canadian federal election
** Preliminary results — Not yet official **
Party	Candidate	Votes	%	±%	Expenditures
Liberal	Terry Sheehan	30,271	47.33	+14.97	
Conservative	Hugh Stevenson	28,648	44.79	+9.20	
New Democratic	Laura Mayer	4,215	6.59	–19.30	
Green	Robyn Kiki Eshkibok	531	0.83	+0.20	
Christian Heritage	James Collins	297	0.46	N/A	
Total valid votes/expense limit					
Total rejected ballots					
Turnout		63,962	66.49		
Eligible voters		96,195			
Liberal notional gain from Conservative		Swing		+2.89	
Source: Elections Canada

2021 federal election redistributed results
Party	Vote	%
Conservative	20,617	35.59
Liberal	18,745	32.36
New Democratic	14,999	25.89
People's	3,037	5.24
Green	365	0.63
Others	160	0.28

=== Sault Ste. Marie, 2013 representation order ===
2021 Canadian federal election: Sault Ste. Marie
Party	Candidate	Votes	%	±%	Expenditures
Liberal	Terry Sheehan	15,231	37.89	-1.16	$73,397.78
Conservative	Sonny Spina	14,984	37.27	+5.12	$87,131.34
New Democratic	Marie Morin-Strom	8,041	20.01	-2.67	$27,710.93
People's	Kasper Makowski	1,923	4.83	+3.05	$3,910.72
Total valid votes/expense limit		40,179	100.00	–	$105,047.67
Total rejected ballots		281	0.00	-0.80	
Turnout		40,460	61.19	-2.25	
Eligible voters		66,121			
Liberal hold		Swing		-1.16	
Source: Elections Canada

2019 Canadian federal election: Sault Ste. Marie
Party	Candidate	Votes	%	±%	Expenditures
Liberal	Terry Sheehan	16,284	39.05	-5.70	$77,577.01
Conservative	Sonny Spina	13,407	32.15	+1.04	$63,685.77
New Democratic	Sara McCleary	9,459	22.68	+0.87	$23,511.40
Green	Geo McLean	1,809	4.34	+2.20	$1,428.49
People's	Amy Zuccato	741	1.78	new	none listed
Total valid votes/expense limit		41,700	99.20		
Total rejected ballots		337	0.80	+0.35	
Turnout		42,037	63.05	-5.24	
Eligible voters		66,668			
Liberal hold		Swing		-3.37	
Source: Elections Canada

2015 Canadian federal election: Sault Ste. Marie
Party	Candidate	Votes	%	±%	Expenditures
Liberal	Terry Sheehan	19,582	44.75	▲25.02	$59,074.57
Conservative	Bryan Hayes	13,615	31.12	▼9.28	$114,243.06
New Democratic	Skip Morrison	9,543	21.81	▼15.63	$63,747.71
Green	Kara Flannigan	934	2.13	▲0.04	$127.42
Marxist–Leninist	Mike Taffarel	83	0.19	▲0.10	none listed
Total valid votes/expense limit		43,757	99.55		$198,539.65
Total rejected ballots		200	0.45	▼0.06	
Turnout		43,957	68.29	▲4.10	
Eligible voters		64,365			
Liberal gain from Conservative		Swing		▲17.15	
Source: Elections Canada

2011 federal election redistributed results
Party	Votes	%
Conservative	16,316	40.40
New Democratic	15,123	37.44
Liberal	7,967	19.73
Green	845	2.09
Others	138	0.34

=== Sault Ste. Marie, 2003 representation order ===
2011 Canadian federal election
Party	Candidate	Votes	%	±%	Expenditures
Conservative	Bryan Hayes	18,328	41.14	▲3.72	$80,142.96
New Democratic	Tony Martin	16,467	37.23	▼3.20	$81,906.09
Liberal	Christian Provenzano	8,343	18.86	▲2.10	$63,159.73
Green	Luke MacMichael	945	2.14	▼2.19	$3,129.72
Christian Heritage	Randy Riauka	111	0.25	new	$105.54
Marxist–Leninist	Mike Taffarel	38	0.09	▼0.11	none listed
Total valid votes/expense limit		44,232	100.0		$86,404.40
Total rejected ballots		228	0.51	▲0.11	
Turnout		44,460	64.19	▲4.77	
Eligible voters		69,259			
Conservative gain from New Democratic		Swing		▲3.46	

2008 Canadian federal election
Party	Candidate	Votes	%	±%	Expenditures
New Democratic	Tony Martin	16,572	40.43	+1.55	$83,799.84
Conservative	Cameron Ross	15,461	37.72	+13.72	$79,518.05
Liberal	Paul Bichler	6,870	16.76	-17.46	$35,533.07
Green	Luke Macmichael	1,774	4.33	+2.28	$2,586.65
First Peoples National	Cory McLeod	235	0.57	+0.08	$433.95
Marxist–Leninist	Mike Taffarel	81	0.20	+0.13	none listed
Total valid votes/expense limit		40,993	100.0		$83,824
Total rejected ballots		165	0.40	-1.25	
Turnout		41,158	59.42	-8.33	
Eligible voters		69,272			
New Democratic hold		Swing		-6.08	

2006 Canadian federal election
Party	Candidate	Votes	%	±%	Expenditures
New Democratic	Tony Martin	17,979	38.88	+0.59	$69,741.00
Liberal	Christian Provenzano	15,825	34.22	-2.33	$66,957.47
Conservative	Kenneth Walker	11,099	24.00	+0.88	$62,248.21
Green	Mark Viitala	1,056	2.28	+0.39	$1,450.96
First Peoples National	Guy Dumas	225	0.49	–	$419.75
Marxist–Leninist	Mike Taffarel	59	0.13	-0.03	$184.15
Total valid votes/expense limit		46,243	100.0		$77,689
Total rejected ballots		192	1.65	+0.59	
Turnout		46,435	67.75		
Eligible voters		68,537			
New Democratic hold		Swing		+1.46	

2004 Canadian federal election
Party	Candidate	Votes	%	±%	Expenditures
New Democratic	Tony Martin	16,512	38.29	+14.30	$66,870.00
Liberal	Carmen Provenzano	15,760	36.55	-11.64	$46,534.02
Conservative	Cameron Ross	9,969	23.12	-2.28	$47,437.02
Green	Julie Emmerson	814	1.89	–	$379.80
Marxist–Leninist	Mike Taffarel	67	0.16	–	$357.98
Total valid votes/expense limit		43,122	100.0		$75,828
Total rejected ballots		250	0.58		
Turnout		43,372	63.36	+0.73	
Eligible voters		68,454			
New Democratic notional gain from Liberal		Swing		+12.97	
Changes from 2000 are based on redistributed results. Change for the Conservative Party is based on the combined totals of the Canadian Alliance and the Progressive Conservative Party.

2000 federal election redistributed results
Party	Vote	%
Liberal	20,510	48.19
New Democratic	10,211	23.99
Alliance	9,287	21.82
Progressive Conservative	1,522	3.58
Others	1,030	2.42

=== Sault Ste. Marie, previous elections ===
2000 Canadian federal election
Party	Candidate	Votes	%	±%
Liberal	Carmen Provenzano	18,867	50.79	+6.30
New Democratic	Bud Wildman	9,202	24.77	-2.35
Alliance	David Ronald Rose	7,006	18.86	-1.01
Progressive Conservative	Doug Lawson	1,168	3.14	-4.80
Green	Kathie Brosemer	776	2.09	
Canadian Action	Martin Bruce Odber	128	0.34	
Total		37,147	100.00	

* Changes for the Canadian Alliance are from the Reform votes in 1997.

1997 Canadian federal election
Party	Candidate	Votes	%	±%
Liberal	Carmen Provenzano	16,871	44.49	-8.42
New Democratic	Phyllis Dietrich	10,283	27.12	+4.95
Reform	David Rose	7,536	19.87	+3.64
Progressive Conservative	Doug Lawson	3,010	7.94	+0.15
Natural Law	Colleen Hibbs	219	0.58	+0.20
Total		37,919	100.00	

1993 Canadian federal election
Party	Candidate	Votes	%	±%
Liberal	Ron Irwin	21,407	52.91	+20.91
New Democratic	Steve Butland	8,970	22.17	-13.11
Reform	Paul Mathewson	6,566	16.23	+16.23
Progressive Conservative	Gerry Nori	3,152	7.79	-24.93
National	Henry A. Roess	209	0.52	
Natural Law	Chris Evans	155	0.38	
Total		40,459	100.00	

1988 Canadian federal election
Party	Candidate	Votes	%	±%
New Democratic	Steve Butland	14,595	35.28	+3.76
Progressive Conservative	Jim Kelleher	13,533	32.72	-5.88
Liberal	Joe Sniezek	13,237	32.00	+2.70
Total		41,365	100.00	

1984 Canadian federal election
Party	Candidate	Votes	%	±%
Progressive Conservative	Jim Kelleher	13,135	38.60	+25.68
New Democratic	Karl Morin-Strom	10,726	31.52	-7.42
Liberal	Ron Irwin	9,972	29.30	-18.66
Commonwealth of Canada	Charles L. Rooney	198	0.58	
Total		34,031	100.00	

1980 Canadian federal election
Party	Candidate	Votes	%	±%
Liberal	Ron Irwin	15,449	47.96	+12.29
New Democratic	Cyril Symes	12,542	38.94	+1.68
Progressive Conservative	Penny Hanson	4,161	12.92	-13.79
Marxist–Leninist	Mike Taffarel	59	0.18	+0.06
Total		32,211	100.00	

1979 Canadian federal election
Party	Candidate	Votes	%	±%
New Democratic	Cyril Symes	12,089	37.26	-13.24
Liberal	Terry Murphy	11,574	35.67	-5.41
Progressive Conservative	Gord Cunningham	8,668	26.71	+18.49
Communist	Richard Orlandini	79	0.24	+0.04
Marxist–Leninist	Mike Taffarel	38	0.12	
Total		32,448	100.00	

1974 Canadian federal election
Party	Candidate	Votes	%	±%
New Democratic	Cyril Symes	19,044	50.50	+13.79
Liberal	Alex Sinclair	15,490	41.08	+5.12
Progressive Conservative	Bob de Fazio	3,098	8.22	-19.10
Communist	Gerrit van Houten	76	0.20	
Total		37,708	100.00	

1972 Canadian federal election
Party	Candidate	Votes	%	±%
New Democratic	Cyril Symes	12,903	36.71	+13.51
Liberal	C. Terrence Murphy	12,639	35.96	-3.87
Progressive Conservative	L.B. Lou Lukenda	9,603	27.32	-9.34
Total		35,145	100.00	

1968 Canadian federal election
Party	Candidate	Votes	%
Liberal	C. Terrence Murphy	12,527	39.83
Progressive Conservative	Russ Ramsay	11,529	36.66
New Democratic	Anne Valentine	7,297	23.20
Independent	George Skov	102	0.32
Total		31,455	100.00

== See also ==
- List of Canadian electoral districts
- Historical federal electoral districts of Canada
