= Terry Sheehan =

Canadian politician (born 1970)

Terry Sheehan MP

Parliamentary Secretary for Economic Development and Official Languages
- In office December 12, 2019 – August 15, 2021
- Minister: Melanie Joly
- Preceded by: Position established

Member of Parliament for Sault Ste. Marie—Algoma Sault Ste. Marie (2015–2025)
- Incumbent
- Assumed office October 19, 2015
- Preceded by: Bryan Hayes

Member of the Sault Ste. Marie City Council from the 2nd ward
- In office December 1, 2003 – October 26, 2015
- Preceded by: Brady Irwin
- Succeeded by: Sandra Hollingsworth

Personal details
- Born: 1970 (age 55–56) Sault Ste. Marie, Ontario
- Party: Liberal
- Spouse: Lisa Bradford
- Children: 2
- Education: Lake Superior State University
- Website: https://tsheehan.liberal.ca/

Terry Sheehan (born 1970) is a Canadian politician who has served as the member of Parliament for the riding of Sault Ste. Marie—Algoma since 2015 as a member of the Liberal Party of Canada. Prior to his parliamentary service, Sheehan served on the Sault Ste. Marie City Council from 2003 to 2015, representing Ward 2, after two terms as a trustee on the Huron-Superior Catholic District School Board.

== Background ==
Sheehan was born in 1970 in Sault Ste. Marie, Ontario. He studied political science at Lake Superior State University.

== Political career ==
=== Municipal politics ===
Sheehan served two terms as a trustee for the Huron-Superior Catholic District School Board. He was elected to city council for Ward 2 in 2003 and was re-elected in the 2006, 2010, and 2014 municipal elections.

=== Federal politics ===
Sheehan was first elected to the House of Commons in the 2015 federal election in the riding of Sault Ste. Marie as a member of the Liberal Party of Canada. In the 42nd Parliament, he was a member of the International Trade Committee and the Industry, Science, and Technology Committee, in addition to serving as co-chair of the Canada-Japan Interparliamentary Group, Chair of the Northern Ontario Liberal Caucus, member of the All-Party Steel Caucus and a member of the Executive Committees of the Canada-Ireland and Canada-Italy Interparliamentary Groups.

Sheehan was re-elected in the 2019 election In the 43rd Parliament, he was named Parliamentary Secretary to the Minister of Economic Development and Official Languages, with responsibility for the Federal Economic Development Initiative for Northern Ontario.

Sheehan won re-election in the 2021 election by a margin of just 247 votes. The result was so close it was not certain until two days after election day, following the count of the riding's mail-in ballots.

Sheehan was re-elected to a fourth term in the 2025 election. The riding had been expanded in the 2022 federal electoral redistribution and had been renamed Sault Ste. Marie—Algoma.

== Personal life ==
Sheehan is married to Lisa Bradford. They have two children.

== Electoral record ==
=== Federal ===
2025 Canadian federal election: Sault Ste. Marie—Algoma
** Preliminary results — Not yet official **
| Party | Candidate | Votes | % | ±% | Expenditures |
|---|---|---|---|---|---|
| Liberal | Terry Sheehan | 30,271 | 47.33 | +14.97 | |
| Conservative | Hugh Stevenson | 28,648 | 44.79 | +9.20 | |
| New Democratic | Laura Mayer | 4,215 | 6.59 | –19.30 | |
| Green | Robyn Kiki Eshkibok | 531 | 0.83 | +0.20 | |
| Christian Heritage | James Collins | 297 | 0.46 | N/A | |
| Total valid votes/expense limit | | | | | |
| Total rejected ballots | | | | | |
| Turnout | | 63,962 | 66.49 | | |
| Eligible voters | | 96,195 | | | |
| Liberal notional gain from Conservative | | Swing | | +2.89 | |
Source: Elections Canada

2021 Canadian federal election: Sault Ste. Marie
| Party | Candidate | Votes | % | ±% | Expenditures |
|---|---|---|---|---|---|
| Liberal | Terry Sheehan | 15,231 | 37.89 | -1.16 | $73,397.78 |
| Conservative | Sonny Spina | 14,984 | 37.27 | +5.12 | $87,131.34 |
| New Democratic | Marie Morin-Strom | 8,041 | 20.01 | -2.67 | $27,710.93 |
| People's | Kasper Makowski | 1,923 | 4.83 | +3.05 | $3,910.72 |
| Total valid votes/expense limit | | 40,179 | 100.00 | – | $105,047.67 |
| Total rejected ballots | | 281 | 0.00 | -0.80 | |
| Turnout | | 40,460 | 61.19 | -2.25 | |
| Eligible voters | | 66,121 | | | |
| Liberal hold | | Swing | | -1.16 | |
Source: Elections Canada

2019 Canadian federal election: Sault Ste. Marie
| Party | Candidate | Votes | % | ±% | Expenditures |
|---|---|---|---|---|---|
| Liberal | Terry Sheehan | 16,284 | 39.05 | -5.70 | $77,577.01 |
| Conservative | Sonny Spina | 13,407 | 32.15 | +1.04 | $63,685.77 |
| New Democratic | Sara McCleary | 9,459 | 22.68 | +0.87 | $23,511.40 |
| Green | Geo McLean | 1,809 | 4.34 | +2.20 | $1,428.49 |
| People's | Amy Zuccato | 741 | 1.78 | new | none listed |
| Total valid votes/expense limit | | 41,700 | 99.20 | | |
| Total rejected ballots | | 337 | 0.80 | +0.35 | |
| Turnout | | 42,037 | 63.05 | -5.24 | |
| Eligible voters | | 66,668 | | | |
| Liberal hold | | Swing | | -3.37 | |
Source: Elections Canada

2015 Canadian federal election
| Party | Candidate | Votes | % | ±% | Expenditures |
|---|---|---|---|---|---|
| Liberal | Terry Sheehan | 19,582 | 44.75 | +25.02 | $59,074.57 |
| Conservative | Bryan Hayes | 13,615 | 31.12 | –9.28 | $114,243.06 |
| New Democratic | Skip Morrison | 9,543 | 21.81 | –15.63 | $63,747.71 |
| Green | Kara Flannigan | 934 | 2.13 | +0.04 | $127.42 |
| Marxist–Leninist | Mike Taffarel | 83 | 0.19 | +0.10 | - |
| Total valid votes/expense limit | | 43,757 | 100.0 | | $198,539.65 |
| Total rejected ballots | | 200 | 0.45 | –0.06 | |
| Turnout | | 43,957 | 69.16 | +4.97 | |
| Eligible voters | | 63,555 | | | |
| Liberal gain from Conservative | | Swing | | +17.15 | |
Source: Elections Canada
