= Terrence Murphy (Canadian politician) =

Canadian politician

Terrence Murphy QC
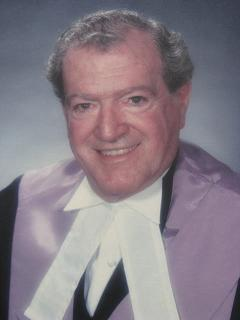
- C. Terrence Murphy

Member of Parliament for Sault Ste. Marie
- In office 25 June 1968 – 29 October 1972
- Preceded by: District created
- Succeeded by: Cyril Symes

Personal details
- Born: Charles Terrence Murphy; 19 October 1926 Sault Ste. Marie, Ontario, Canada
- Died: 12 July 2008 (aged 81)
- Party: Liberal
- Profession: Barrister; Solicitor; Lawyer

Charles Terrence Murphy QC (19 October 1926 – 12 July 2008) was a Canadian lawyer, politician and judge.

== Early life and education ==
Born in Sault Ste. Marie, Ontario, Murphy was the eldest son of Charlie and Monica Murphy. He attended Holy Angels Catholic School and Sault Collegiate Institute (Class of 1943), and entered St. Peter's Seminary in London, Ontario. However, a year later he transferred to Assumption College at the University of Western Ontario, from which he graduated at the age of 19 with a BA (Hon) in philosophy. From there he went to Osgoode Hall Law School.

During his time in Toronto, Murphy used to attend the home of Marshall McLuhan, who was then an English professor at the University of Toronto, for beer and conversation.

== Career ==
In 1949, aged 22, Murphy became the youngest person in Ontario to be called to the Bar. He returned to Sault Ste. Marie and spent seven years in partnership with George Majic, before establishing his own practice.

Murphy served a term as Alderman for the City of Sault Ste. Marie in 1965. He was elected in 1968 as a Liberal member of parliament representing the Sault Ste. Marie electoral district, at which time he joined the firm of Fitzgerald, Kelleher and Kurisko.

While a member of parliament, Murphy served on the parliamentary justice committee. In 1970 he became the leader of the Canadian delegation in the North Atlantic Assembly, the body of elected representatives overseeing NATO. He was named president of the North Atlantic Assembly in 1971, and also attended meetings of a group nicknamed "the Nine Wise Men", which had been formed to review NATO policy and organization. The group consisted of one representative from each of the NATO countries, including former Canadian Prime Minister Lester B. Pearson, and later West German Chancellor Helmut Schmidt.

In October 1970, Liberal Prime Minister Pierre Trudeau proclaimed a state of "apprehended insurrection" under the War Measures Act in response to the kidnapping of British Trade Commissioner James Cross by Quebec separatists. Regulations under the act permitted arrest and detention without charge and banned the kidnappers' organization, the Front de libération du Québec (FLQ). Murphy objected to what he considered to be an unjustifiable suppression of civil liberties and planned to vote against the government. Trudeau met with him and told him that, if he voted against the government, he would be ejected from the Liberal caucus and barred from running for the party again, and his constituency would not receive any programmes or benefits from the government during his tenure in office. Murphy refused to support the government, but did not want his constituents to suffer as a result, so he absented himself from the House during the key vote.

Murphy returned to legal practice with the firm after his defeat in the 1972 election by New Democratic Party candidate Cyril Symes. He ran against Symes again in the 1979 election, but was again defeated.

In 1980 he was appointed Judge for the District of Sudbury/Manitoulin, becoming a judge of the Superior Court of Justice when the superior courts of the province were re-structured. He retired from the bench in 2000. Five years later, the Advocates' Society listed Murphy as one of the 50 best advocates practising in Ontario from 1950 to 2000, in the book Learned Friends.
