= James Kelleher =

Canadian politician

The Honourable James Kelleher PC QC

Canadian Senator from Ontario
- In office September 23, 1990 – October 2, 2005
- Appointed by: Brian Mulroney

Member of Parliament for Sault Ste. Marie
- In office 1984–1988
- Preceded by: Ron Irwin
- Succeeded by: Steve Butland

Personal details
- Born: James Francis Kelleher; October 2, 1930 Sault Ste. Marie, Ontario, Canada
- Died: June 2, 2013 (aged 82) Toronto, Ontario, Canada
- Party: Progressive Conservative
- Occupation: Lawyer
- Cabinet: Minister for International Trade (1984-1986); Solicitor General of Canada (1986-1988)

James Francis Kelleher PC QC (October 2, 1930 – June 2, 2013) was a Canadian politician and retired senator.

== Background ==
Born in Sault Ste. Marie, Ontario, he received a B.A. degree in 1952 from Queen's University and an LL.B. degree in 1956 from Osgoode Hall Law School. Kelleher was first elected to the House of Commons of Canada in the 1984 election as the Progressive Conservative Member of Parliament for Sault Ste. Marie, Ontario.

He was appointed minister of international trade in the first cabinet of prime minister Brian Mulroney. In 1986, he became solicitor general as the result of a cabinet shuffle, and remained so until his defeat in the 1988 election.

On September 23, 1990, Kelleher was appointed to the Senate of Canada on Mulroney's recommendation. He retired from the upper house upon his seventy-fifth birthday, October 2, 2005, due to the Senate's mandatory retirement rules.

He died of heart problems in 2013.

== Archives ==
There is a James Kelleher fonds at Library and Archives Canada.
