= Sault Collegiate Institute =

Former school in Ontario, Canada

Coordinates: 46.51552°N 84.32583°W

Sault Collegiate Institute was a public secondary school in Sault Ste Marie, Ontario. It was founded in 1902 as Sault Collegiate High School and closed as a public secondary school in 1981. It was converted to an elementary French immersion school which closed in 1995. The school building was demolished in 2001 to make room for the Collegiate Heights Retirement Residence, which is now located on the site.

Famous alumni include Governor General David Lloyd Johnston, former Member of Parliament, artist Ken Danby and judge Terry Murphy and Benny Cooperman author Howard Engel got his start, in the 1950s, at the school teaching English and social studies.
