= Sault Ste. Marie language resolution =

Municipal government resolution

The Sault Ste. Marie language resolution was a government motion passed on January 29, 1990, by Sault Ste. Marie City Council, the governing body of the city of Sault Ste. Marie, Ontario, Canada, which resolved that English was the sole working language of city government. The resolution ignited a national controversy which made the city a flashpoint in the Meech Lake Accord debate.

The Sault Ste. Marie resolution was not the first of its kind in Ontario, but Sault Ste. Marie was the largest municipality to pass such a resolution and bore the brunt of the controversy. The resolution was struck down by a court ruling in 1994, and ceased to have legal effect. In 2010, John Rowswell, a subsequent mayor of Sault Ste. Marie, apologized to French Canadians across the country for the resolution.

== Background ==
Sault Ste. Marie was founded by French-speaking missionaries in 1623 but had become overwhelmingly English-speaking by the twentieth century.

In response to a French-language education controversy which began in 1987 when a group of Franco-Ontarian families lobbied to have a new French school opened in the city, the Sault Alliance for the Preservation of English Language Rights (SAPELR) was formed and began circulating petitions to have this resolution passed by council. The group worked in concert with the Alliance for the Preservation of English in Canada (APEC), a lobby group which was concurrently campaigning against the provincial government's French Language Services Act. Although that law dealt only with provincial government services, APEC's strategy was to convince municipalities that they would be required to provide services in French, regardless of cost or benefit, in an attempt to convince the municipalities to pass this type of resolution. As a result of the schooling controversy, the SAPELR petition quickly garnered over 25,000 signatures.

The resolution was widely seen as retaliation for Quebec Premier Robert Bourassa's move to override the Supreme Court of Canada ruling that declared parts of Bill 101 unconstitutional. Bill 101 had declared French as the only official language of Quebec.

== Text of the resolution ==
Whereas the City of Sault Ste. Marie is composed of many different ethnic groups, languages and cultures;

And whereas the City of Sault Ste. Marie has always shown respect for each of these cultures by providing preferential treatment for none;

And whereas the City of Sault Ste. Marie has throughout its history had one common working language for all of its written and oral communications, which is English;

And whereas the preferred common language of commerce, business, trade, science and normal everyday activities is English;

Now therefore be it resolved that the Corporation of the City of Sault Ste. Marie in the interests of maintaining goodwill, harmony and sound and responsible fiscal management continue as it has in the past to accept the use of English as the official language of communication with its citizens and with all levels of governments, thereby demonstrating the concept of equality for each ethnic, cultural and language group in its jurisdiction.

And further resolved in accordance with the Provisions of the Municipal Act of Ontario Part VII and more specifically Section 104a of Said Act the Council of the Corporation of the City of Sault Ste. Marie declares English to be the official language of the said Corporation.

== Resolution passes ==
On January 27, 1990, the city's daily newspaper, The Sault Star, reported that council would debate the language resolution two days later. This triggered the attention of the national media, and with reporters from all across Canada in town to cover the debate. The council adopted the resolution by a vote of 11 in favour with only two, Ward Two alderman Tom Angus and Ward Three alderman Harry Hurdon voting against.

Angus, who had served on council for three decades, derided the motion as "an unnecessary resolution that solves a problem that does not exist".

== Controversy ==
Criticism of the resolution came from across the country and locally. In an attempt to control the growing controversy, the mayor and council unanimously adopted a subsequent resolution on February 19, 1990 recognizing "the important role which French Canadians have played in the development of our community and our country."

However, the second resolution did not rescind the January 29 resolution. At the same time the mayor issued an open letter blaming critics of the earlier resolution for having "not read it or have read it and applied their own connotations."

Many political figures, including Brian Mulroney, Jean Chrétien and Ontario premier David Peterson, who had strongly condemned Premier Bourassa's use of the notwithstanding clause, expressed their opposition to the city's move. Both Peterson and his successor as premier, Bob Rae, refused to meet with mayor Joe Fratesi on several subsequent occasions, even to discuss unrelated matters.

In particular, the resolution was seen as a slap in the face to Quebec, where it was widely viewed as racist. (One Environment Canada meteorologist sent out a weather report for Sault Ste. Marie in which the forecast called for "a chance of flurries and Nazis", leading to her suspension.) Council defended the resolution, suggesting that Quebec's language laws and its refusal to abide by the Supreme Court ruling also constituted racism.

Council was also criticized for seemingly turning its back on the city's own history; although in modern times francophones are only a small percentage of the city's population, the city's history is intimately connected to early French Canadian missionary and voyageur exploration of the Great Lakes area. Some commentators also jokingly suggested that the resolution would require the city to change its name to St. Mary's Falls.

Entertainers weighed in on the controversy; on their 1991 album Road Apples, The Tragically Hip criticized the resolution in the song "Born in the Water":

Smart as trees in Sault Ste. Marie

I can speak my mother tongue
Passing laws, just because
And singing songs of the English unsung
How could you do it?
How could you even try?
When you were born in the water

And you were raised up in the sky?

== Aftereffects ==
Fratesi, who was viewed by Sault Ste. Marie voters throughout the controversy as standing up for the city's interests, was re-elected mayor in a landslide in 1991. He later became embroiled in a conflict of interest controversy in 1995 when he applied for the job of chief administrative officer of the city, while still sitting as mayor.

Quebec Premier Bourassa later passed Bill 86, which amended that province's language laws in accordance with the Supreme Court ruling, so the controversy died down.

On June 30, 1994, a court ruling struck down the English-only resolution as ultra vires the council's authority. On August 9, 1999, a resolution was brought forward under a new city council to strike down the resolution. The city's solicitor advised that the resolution was out of order given that a court had already struck down the resolution. Attempting to do what it could, the council then unanimously passed the following resolution:

Moved by Councillor Derik Brandt
Seconded by Councillor Sam Lepore
Whereas the "language resolution" was struck down by the courts because it was beyond the City’s authority; and
Whereas it is not legally possible to rescind a resolution that has already been struck down by the courts;

Be It Resolved that a notation be added to the Minutes of the Regular Meeting of City Council of January 29, 1990 to include the following beside item 5(e); N.B. "This resolution was struck down by the courts on June 30, 1994 and therefore has no effect."

The effect of the resolution was to amend the minutes containing the English-only resolution to note that the resolution had been struck down.

As recently as 2007, The Gazette in Montreal referred to the town of Hérouxville, then embroiled in a controversy around reasonable accommodation of immigrants, as Quebec's "own Sault Ste. Marie".

== Apology and further actions by council ==
On January 28, 2010, 20 years less a day after the original resolution was passed, then-Sault Ste. Marie Mayor John Rowswell apologized to French-Canadians across the country for the resolution of the prior council.

On January 29, 2024, on the 34th anniversary of the resolution, Sault Ste. Marie City Council unanimously passed a resolution to improve French language services offered by the city. In his speech, Mayor Matthew Shoemaker reiterated that the 1990 resolution was a mistake and outlined the importance of French culture and language in the city's history. The new resolution directs the CAO to ensure that there is the ability for Francophone residents to navigate municipal services in French.
