= Ron Irwin =

Canadian politician (1936–2020)

The Honourable Ron Irwin PC CM QC

Canadian Ambassador to Ireland
- In office September 4, 1998 – 2001
- Monarch: Elizabeth II
- Prime Minister: Jean Chrétien
- Preceded by: Michael B. Phillips
- Succeeded by: William Gusen (chargé d'affaires)

Minister of Indian Affairs and Northern Development
- In office November 4, 1993 – June 10, 1997
- Prime Minister: Jean Chrétien
- Preceded by: Pauline Browes
- Succeeded by: Jane Stewart

Member of Parliament for Sault Ste. Marie
- In office October 25, 1993 – June 1, 1997
- Preceded by: Steve Butland
- Succeeded by: Carmen Provenzano
- In office February 18, 1980 – September 3, 1984
- Preceded by: Cyril Symes
- Succeeded by: James Kelleher

20th Mayor of Sault Ste. Marie, Ontario
- In office December 1972 – December 1974
- Preceded by: John Rhodes
- Succeeded by: Nick Trbovich

Sault Ste. Marie Alderman, Ward 1
- In office December 1968 – December 1972
- Preceded by: Frank Shunock
- Succeeded by: William Hrynuik

Personal details
- Born: Ronald Albert Irwin; October 29, 1936 Sault Ste. Marie, Ontario, Canada
- Died: December 5, 2020 (aged 84)
- Party: Liberal
- Occupation: Lawyer; municipal politician

Ronald A. Irwin PC CM QC (October 29, 1936 – December 5, 2020) was a Canadian diplomat and politician.

== Early life ==
Born in Sault Ste. Marie, Ontario, Irwin earned an undergraduate degree from the University of Western Ontario and a law degree from Osgoode Hall Law School of York University. While at the University of Western Ontario he joined the Sigma Kappa Sigma chapter of Delta Upsilon.

Irwin was born into a political family, with four members of his family having served in municipal office. His great-grandfather Thomas Irwin had been a councillor in the township of Tarentorus in the 1910s. Two of Irwin's great-uncles, sons of Alfred, had served as well. Thomas Irwin was mayor of the city from 1926 to 1929 and Fred Irwin had been a city alderman around that same time.

== Public service ==
Irwin was elected to two terms on Sault Ste. Marie city council as an alderman for the city's ward one, in 1968 and 1970.

Following John Rhodes' election to the provincial legislature in October 1971, Irwin chose to seek the mayor's chair for the remainder of the term. Following four rounds of in camera voting by his council colleagues, Irwin was named mayor, edging our three follow aldermen.

He was returned to the mayors office in the 1973 municipal election, serving a full term ending that ended in January 1975. He also served as a school trustee, and director of the local Chamber of Commerce.

From 1977 to 1980, he was a member of the Canadian Radio-television and Telecommunications Commission.

Irwin was first elected to the House of Commons of Canada in the 1980 federal election as a Liberal. He served as parliamentary secretary to Jean Chrétien while the latter was justice minister. Irwin was defeated in the 1984 election but returned to parliament in the 1993 election.

When the Liberals returned to power as a result of the 1993 election, Chrétien, now Prime Minister of Canada, appointed Irwin to his cabinet as Minister of Indian Affairs and Northern Development. Irwin retired from parliament in 1997.

Irwin served as a personal advisor to Prime Minister Chrétien from 1997 to 1998. He was appointed Canadian Ambassador to Ireland in 1998, and served until 2001. In 2001, Irwin was appointed Canada's Consul General to Boston.

Irwin was made a Member of the Order of Canada on June 25, 1975 with the citation "Former Mayor of Sault Ste. Marie. For his contribution to the improvement of conditions in his city through his dedicated service with many civic groups."

== Death ==
Irwin died in Sault Ste. Marie on December 5, 2020, at the age of 84. His remains were interred at Holy Sepulchre Cemetery.

26th Canadian Ministry (1993–2003) – Cabinet of Jean Chrétien
Cabinet post (1)
| Predecessor | Office | Successor |
|---|---|---|
| Pauline Browes | Minister of Indian Affairs and Northern Development; 1993–1997 | Jane Stewart |
