= Joe Fratesi =

Canadian politician

Joseph Fratesi is the former mayor and former chief administrative officer of Sault Ste. Marie, Ontario. Serving as Sault Ste. Marie's mayor from 1986 to 1996, he was the longest-serving mayor in Sault Ste. Marie's history, breaking the record that W. John McMeeken had held since 1945.

On January 29, 1990, during his term as mayor, the city council approved a resolution making English the sole working language of city government. The council's decision, which Fratesi had strongly supported, caused controversy within the town and across Canada. The resolution was widely seen as retaliation for Quebec Premier Robert Bourassa's move to override the Supreme Court of Canada ruling that declared parts of Bill 101 unconstitutional. Bill 101 had declared French as the only official language of Quebec. Many prominent politicians, such as Premiers David Peterson and Bob Rae, and Prime Minister Brian Mulroney, refused to meet with Fratesi on unrelated matters due to his stance. However, Fratesi was re-elected by a landslide in 1991. The resolution was struck down by a court ruling in 1994, one year after Premier Bourassa passed Bill 86 which amended that province's language laws in accordance with the Supreme Court ruling.

Fratesi was involved in a conflict of interest controversy in 1995 when he applied for and got the post of chief administrative officer while still sitting as mayor. The Ontario Superior Court banned Fratesi from running for municipal officer for six years following a finding he had been in conflict of interest by applying for the chief administrative position while still holding the mayoral office. After stepping down as mayor, he was briefly replaced by Michael Sanzosti before former MP Steve Butland was elected in a special 1996 byelection. He retired as chief administrative officer in 2015.
