= Sault Ste. Marie (provincial electoral district) =

Provincial electoral district in Ontario, Canada

Coordinates: 46.5419°N 84.3448°W

Ontario electoral district
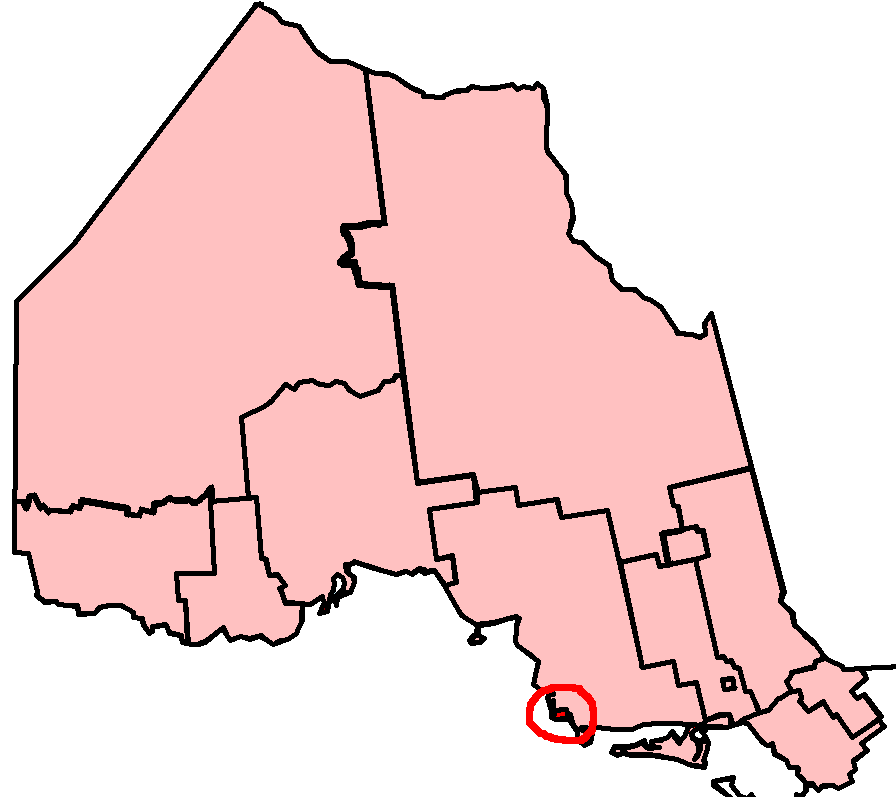
- Sault Ste. Marie in relation to other Northern Ontario electoral districts

Provincial electoral district
- Legislature: Legislative Assembly of Ontario
MPP
Chris Scott
Independent
- District created: 1902
- First contested: 1902
- Last contested: 2025

Demographics
- Population (2016): 73,370
- Electors (2018): 59,545
- Area (km²): 275
- Pop. density (per km²): 266.8
- Census division: Algoma
- Census subdivision: Sault Ste. Marie

Sault Ste. Marie is a provincial electoral district in the Legislative Assembly of Ontario, representing the city of Sault Ste. Marie.

== History ==
The riding was created in 1902 from part of Algoma East, and originally consisted of a large section of Algoma District from the boundary of Thunder Bay District to the mouth of the Echo River. It has essentially had the same boundaries (that of the city of Sault Ste. Marie) since the 1966 redistribution.

Prior to 1996, Ontario was divided into the same electoral districts as those used for federal electoral purposes. They were redistributed whenever a readjustment took place at the federal level.

In 2005, legislation was passed by the Legislature to divide Ontario into 107 electoral districts, beginning with the next provincial election in 2007. The eleven northern electoral districts, including Sault Ste. Marie, are those defined for federal purposes in 1996, based on the 1991 census (except for a minor boundary adjustment). The 96 southern electoral districts are those defined for federal electoral purposes in 2003, based on the 2001 census. Without this legislation, the number of electoral districts in northern Ontario would have been reduced from eleven to ten.

As a result, the provincial electoral district consists solely of the city of Sault Ste. Marie, while the federal electoral district also includes Prince Township, the Rankin, Garden River, Goulais Bay and Obadjiwan Indian reserves, and a portion of Unorganized North Algoma District extending north to the Montreal River.

== Demographics ==
According to the 2011 Canadian census

- Ethnic groups: 89.2% White, 9.2% Aboriginal
- Languages: 87.0% English, 4.9% Italian, 4.1% French
- Religion: 74.4% Christian (40.6% Catholic, 9.7% United Church, 6.4% Anglican, 2.7% Lutheran, 1.8% Presbyterian, 1.7% Pentecostal, 1.6% Baptist, 9.8% other Christian), 24.6% no religion
- Average household income: $69,456
- Median household income: $56,051
- Average individual income: $37,466
- Median individual income: $30,118

== Members of Provincial Parliament ==
This riding has elected the following members of the Legislative Assembly of Ontario:

Sault Ste. Marie
Assembly	Years	Member	Party
Riding created in 1902 from Algoma East
10th	1902–1903	Andrew Miscampbell	Conservative
10th	1903–1904	Charles Napier Smith	Liberal
11th	1904–1908	Charles Napier Smith	Liberal
12th	1908–1911	William Hearst	Conservative
13th	1911–1914	William Hearst	Conservative
14th	1914–1919	William Hearst	Conservative
15th	1919–1923	James Cunningham	Labour
16th	1923–1926	James Lyons	Conservative
17th	1926–1929	James Lyons	Conservative
18th	1929–1934	James Lyons	Conservative
19th	1934–1937	Augustus Roberts	Liberal
20th	1937–1937	Richard McMeekin	Liberal
20th	1937–1943	Colin Campbell	Liberal
21st	1943–1945	George Isaac Harvey	Co-operative Commonwealth
22nd	1945–1948	George Isaac Harvey	Co-operative Commonwealth
23rd	1948–1951	George Isaac Harvey	Co-operative Commonwealth
24th	1951–1955	Harry Lyons	Progressive Conservative
25th	1955–1959	Harry Lyons	Progressive Conservative
26th	1959–1962	Harry Lyons	Progressive Conservative
26th	1962–1963	Arthur Wishart	Progressive Conservative
27th	1963–1967	Arthur Wishart	Progressive Conservative
28th	1967–1971	Arthur Wishart	Progressive Conservative
29th	1971–1975	John Rhodes	Progressive Conservative
30th	1975–1977	John Rhodes	Progressive Conservative
31st	1977–1978	John Rhodes	Progressive Conservative
31st	1978–1981	Russ Ramsay	Progressive Conservative
32nd	1981–1985	Russ Ramsay	Progressive Conservative
33rd	1985–1987	Karl Morin-Strom	New Democratic
34th	1987–1990	Karl Morin-Strom	New Democratic
35th	1990–1995	Tony Martin	New Democratic
36th	1995–1999	Tony Martin	New Democratic
37th	1999–2003	Tony Martin	New Democratic
38th	2003–2007	David Orazietti	Liberal
39th	2007–2011	David Orazietti	Liberal
40th	2011–2014	David Orazietti	Liberal
41st	2014–2017	David Orazietti	Liberal
41st	2017–2018	Ross Romano	Progressive Conservative
42nd	2018–2022	Ross Romano	Progressive Conservative
43rd	2022–2025	Ross Romano	Progressive Conservative
44th	2025–2025	Chris Scott	Progressive Conservative
44th	2025–present	Chris Scott	Independent

== Election results ==
Winning party in each polling division of Sault Ste. Marie at the 2025 Ontario general election

2025 Ontario general election
Party	Candidate	Votes	%	±%	Expenditures
Progressive Conservative	Chris Scott	13,071	43.07	–3.82	$52,847
New Democratic	Lisa Vezeau-Allen	12,957	42.69	+5.39	$86,975
Liberal	Gurwinder Dusanjh	3,036	10.00	+4.01	$7,800
New Blue	Arnold Heino	564	1.86	–1.47	$1,071
Green	Jaycob Jacques	421	1.39	–1.12	$0
Ontario Party	Paul Frolich	301	0.99	–	$0
Total valid votes/expense limit		30,350	99.30	–	$98,579
Total rejected, unmarked and declined ballots		215	0.70	+0.17	
Turnout		30,565	49.92	+5.43	
Eligible voters		61,229			
Progressive Conservative hold		Swing		–4.61	
Source: Elections Ontario

Winning party in each polling division of Sault Ste. Marie at the 2022 Ontario general election

2022 Ontario general election
Party	Candidate	Votes	%	±%	Expenditures
Progressive Conservative	Ross Romano	12,606	46.89	+4.86	$49,426
New Democratic	Michele McCleave-Kennedy	10,029	37.30	–3.43	$78,662
Liberal	Liam Hancock	1,610	5.99	–3.97	$0
Independent	Naomi Sayers	1,070	3.98	–	$2,001
New Blue	Shane Pankhurst	894	3.33	–	$1,690
Green	Keagan Gilfillan	675	2.51	–0.74	$381
Total valid votes/expense limit		26,884	99.47	–	$85,145
Total rejected, unmarked and declined ballots		143	0.53	–0.48	
Turnout		27,027	44.49	–10.00	
Eligible voters		60,748			
Progressive Conservative hold		Swing		+4.15	
Source: Elections Ontario

2018 Ontario general election
Party	Candidate	Votes	%	±%	Expenditures
Progressive Conservative	Ross Romano	13,498	42.03	+1.60	$37,312
New Democratic	Michele McCleave-Kennedy	13,084	40.74	+7.87	$14,489
Liberal	Jaclynne Hamel	3,199	9.96	–13.08	$23,097
Green	Kara Flannigan	1,044	3.25	+1.26	$2,910
Northern Ontario Heritage	Sandra Holmberg	993	3.09	–	$0
Libertarian	Lance Brizard	299	0.93	+0.66	none listed
Total valid votes		32,117	98.99		
Total rejected, unmarked and declined ballots		329	1.01	+0.63	
Turnout		32,446	54.49	+10.63	
Eligible voters		59,545			
Progressive Conservative hold		Swing		–3.13	
Source: Elections Ontario

Ontario provincial by-election, June 1, 2017 Resignation of David Orazietti
Party	Candidate	Votes	%	±%
Progressive Conservative	Ross Romano	10,411	40.42	+28.03
New Democratic	Joe Krmpotich	8,465	32.87	+7.40
Liberal	Debbie Amaroso	5,935	23.04	–35.48
Green	Kara Flannigan	512	1.99	–1.24
None of the Above	Above Znoneofthe	313	1.22	–
Libertarian	Gene Balfour	71	0.28	–0.11
Pauper	John Turmel	47	0.18	–
Total valid votes		25,754	99.61	
Total rejected, unmarked and declined ballots		100	0.39	–0.50
Turnout		25,854	43.86	–6.91
Eligible voters		58,944		
Progressive Conservative gain from Liberal		Swing		+10.31
Source: Elections Ontario

2014 Ontario general election
Party	Candidate	Votes	%	±%
Liberal	David Orazietti	17,490	58.53	+3.57
New Democratic	Celia Ross	7,610	25.47	–5.36
Progressive Conservative	Rod Fremlin	3,704	12.39	+0.53
Green	Kara Flannigan	965	3.23	+1.46
Libertarian	Austin Williams	115	0.38	–
Total valid votes		29,884	99.12	
Total rejected, unmarked and declined ballots		266	0.88	+0.38
Turnout		30,150	50.77	+1.42
Eligible voters		59,385		
Liberal hold		Swing		+4.47
Source: Elections Ontario

2011 Ontario general election
Party	Candidate	Votes	%	±%
Liberal	David Orazietti	16,109	54.95	–5.18
New Democratic	Celia Ross	9,037	30.83	+4.44
Progressive Conservative	Jib Turner	3,477	11.86	+4.55
Green	Luke Macmichael	519	1.77	–2.52
Family Coalition	Matthew Hunt	172	0.59	–1.30
Total valid votes		29,314	99.50	
Total rejected, unmarked and declined ballots		147	0.50	–0.01
Turnout		29,461	49.35	–6.21
Eligible voters		59,698		
Liberal hold		Swing		–4.81
Source: Elections Ontario

2007 Ontario general election
Party	Candidate	Votes	%	±%
Liberal	David Orazietti	19,316	60.13	+3.09
New Democratic	Jeff Arbus	8,475	26.38	–5.99
Progressive Conservative	Josh Pringle	2,349	7.31	–0.29
Green	André Riopel	1,377	4.29	+3.03
Family Coalition	Bill Murphy	605	1.88	+0.16
Total valid votes		32,122	99.50	
Total rejected, unmarked and declined ballots		163	0.50	–0.06
Turnout		32,285	55.56	–5.54
Eligible voters		58,108		
Liberal hold		Swing		+4.54
Source: Elections Ontario

2003 Ontario general election
Party	Candidate	Votes	%	±%
Liberal	David Orazietti	20,050	57.04	+29.45
New Democratic	Tony Martin	11,379	32.37	–10.86
Progressive Conservative	Bruce Willson	2,674	7.61	–20.79
Family Coalition	Al Walker	606	1.72	–
Green	Dan Brosemer	441	1.25	–
Total valid votes		35,150	99.44	
Total rejected, unmarked and declined ballots		199	0.56	–0.12
Turnout		35,349	61.10	–0.98
Eligible voters		57,857		
Liberal gain from New Democratic		Swing		+25.12
Source: Elections Ontario

1999 Ontario general election
Party	Candidate	Votes	%	±%
New Democratic	Tony Martin	15,949	43.23	–0.10
Progressive Conservative	James Caicco	10,477	28.40	+6.72
Liberal	Terry Sheehan	10,180	27.59	–5.27
Natural Law	Colleen Hibbs	288	0.78	–
Total valid votes		36,894	99.32	
Total rejected, unmarked and declined ballots		252	0.68	–0.22
Turnout		37,146	62.07	–0.17
Eligible voters		59,841		
New Democratic hold		Swing		–3.41
Source: Elections Ontario

1995 Ontario general election
Party	Candidate	Votes	%	±%
New Democratic	Tony Martin	15,392	43.33	+7.08
Liberal	Carmen Provenzano	11,672	32.86	–1.60
Progressive Conservative	Lou Turco	7,699	21.68	+13.03
Green	Paul Thompson	757	2.13	–
Total valid votes		35,520	99.10	
Total rejected, unmarked and declined ballots		321	0.90	–0.09
Turnout		35,841	62.24	–6.01
Eligible voters		57,581		
New Democratic hold		Swing		+4.34
Source: Elections Ontario

1990 Ontario general election
Party	Candidate	Votes	%	±%
New Democratic	Tony Martin	14,036	36.26	–12.74
Liberal	Don MacGregor	13,339	34.46	–7.64
Confederation of Regions	Don Edwards	7,991	20.64	–
Progressive Conservative	John Solski	3,347	8.65	–0.26
Total valid votes		38,713	99.01	
Total rejected, unmarked and declined ballots		386	0.99	+0.77
Turnout		39,099	68.26	–2.10
Eligible voters		57,281		
New Democratic hold		Swing		–2.55
Source: Elections Ontario

1987 Ontario general election
Party	Candidate	Votes	%	±%
New Democratic	Karl Morin-Strom	19,064	49.00	+4.15
Liberal	Albert Ferranti	16,381	42.10	+28.86
Progressive Conservative	Udo Rauk	3,464	8.90	–33.01
Total valid votes		38,909	99.78	
Total rejected ballots		86	0.22	–0.16
Turnout		38,995	70.36	+5.93
Eligible voters		55,422		
New Democratic hold		Swing		–12.36
Source: Elections Ontario

1985 Ontario general election
Party	Candidate	Votes	%	±%
New Democratic	Karl Morin-Strom	16,362	44.85	+20.51
Progressive Conservative	Russ Ramsay	15,293	41.92	–8.08
Liberal	Roy Youngson	4,830	13.24	–12.43
Total valid votes		36,485	99.62	
Total rejected ballots		138	0.38	+0.10
Turnout		36,623	64.43	+10.17
Eligible voters		56,841		
New Democratic gain from Progressive Conservative		Swing		+14.29
Source: Elections Ontario

1981 Ontario general election
Party	Candidate	Votes	%	±%
Progressive Conservative	Russ Ramsay	14,712	49.99	–2.15
Liberal	Albert Ferranti	7,555	25.67	+10.95
New Democratic	Susan Brothers	7,162	24.34	–8.81
Total valid votes		29,429	99.72	
Total rejected ballots		83	0.28	–0.01
Turnout		29,512	54.26	–5.16
Eligible voters		54,388		
Progressive Conservative hold		Swing		–6.55
Source: Elections Ontario

Ontario provincial by-election, December 14, 1978 Death of John Rhodes
Party	Candidate	Votes	%	±%
Progressive Conservative	Russ Ramsay	15,960	52.14	–3.14
New Democratic	Ronald Moreau	10,145	33.14	–0.42
Liberal	Ronald Luciano	4,505	14.72	+4.03
Total valid votes		30,610	99.71	
Total rejected ballots		89	0.29	–0.31
Turnout		30,699	59.42	–10.16
Eligible voters		51,661		
Progressive Conservative hold		Swing		–1.36
Source: Elections Ontario

1977 Ontario general election
Party	Candidate	Votes	%	±%
Progressive Conservative	John Rhodes	19,209	55.28	+12.83
New Democratic	Don Burgess	11,660	33.56	–6.12
Liberal	John Nelson	3,715	10.69	–6.49
Communist	Arlene Bovingdon	162	0.47	–0.22
Total valid votes		34,746	99.40	
Total rejected ballots		211	0.60	+0.15
Turnout		34,957	69.58	–1.28
Eligible voters		50,240		
Progressive Conservative hold		Swing		+9.47
Source: Elections Ontario

1975 Ontario general election
Party	Candidate	Votes	%	±%
Progressive Conservative	John Rhodes	14,415	42.46	–0.54
New Democratic	Ron Moreau	13,470	39.67	–0.35
Liberal	Bob Gernon	5,835	17.19	+0.21
Communist	Gordon Massie	232	0.68	–
Total valid votes		33,952	99.54	
Total rejected ballots		156	0.46	–0.04
Turnout		34,108	70.86	–8.38
Eligible voters		48,133		
Progressive Conservative hold		Swing		–0.09
Source: Elections Ontario

1971 Ontario general election
Party	Candidate	Votes	%	±%
Progressive Conservative	John Rhodes	14,983	43.00	+0.79
New Democratic	Anne Valentine	13,948	40.03	+5.01
Liberal	Jim Hilsinger	5,915	16.97	–5.80
Total valid votes		34,846	99.50	
Total rejected ballots		174	0.50	–0.16
Turnout		35,020	79.24	+1.39
Eligible voters		44,195		
Progressive Conservative hold		Swing		–2.11
Source: Elections Ontario

1967 Ontario general election
Party	Candidate	Votes	%	±%
Progressive Conservative	Arthur Wishart	11,807	42.21	–0.04
New Democratic	Earl Orchard	9,797	35.02	+11.46
Liberal	Frank Shunock	6,371	22.77	–11.43
Total valid votes		27,975	99.35	
Total rejected ballots		184	0.65	–0.41
Turnout		28,159	77.85	+8.74
Eligible voters		36,169		
Progressive Conservative hold		Swing		–5.75
Source: Elections Ontario

1963 Ontario general election
Party	Candidate	Votes	%	±%
Progressive Conservative	Arthur Wishart	11,559	42.24	+2.15
Liberal	Frank Ianni	9,359	34.20	+0.44
New Democratic	Lloyd B. Hetherington	6,446	23.56	–2.59
Total valid votes		27,364	98.93	
Total rejected ballots		295	1.07	–0.06
Turnout		27,659	69.12	+9.35
Eligible voters		40,018		
Progressive Conservative hold		Swing		+0.85
Source: Elections Ontario

1959 Ontario general election
Party	Candidate	Votes	%	±%
Progressive Conservative	Harry Lyons	8,260	40.10	–1.68
Liberal	Joeseph Hussey	6,955	33.76	+9.31
Co-operative Commonwealth	Leslie C. Woodcock	5,386	26.14	–5.18
Total valid votes		20,601	98.87	
Total rejected ballots		235	1.13	–0.37
Turnout		20,836	59.76	–3.92
Eligible voters		34,864		
Progressive Conservative hold		Swing		–5.49
Source: Elections Ontario

1955 Ontario general election
Party	Candidate	Votes	%	±%
Progressive Conservative	Harry Lyons	7,716	41.77	+2.35
Co-operative Commonwealth	Harvey Claude Willoughby	5,785	31.32	+3.16
Liberal	Wylie A. Rodman	4,517	24.45	–7.96
Labor–Progressive	Edward Bain	453	2.45	–
Total valid votes		18,471	98.51	
Total rejected ballots		280	1.49	+0.18
Turnout		18,751	63.68	–7.58
Eligible voters		29,446		
Progressive Conservative hold		Swing		–0.40
Source: Elections Ontario

1951 Ontario general election
Party	Candidate	Votes	%	±%
Progressive Conservative	Harry Lyons	7,359	39.42	+6.84
Liberal	Norman S. Currie	6,051	32.42	+6.77
Co-operative Commonwealth	George Isaac Harvey	5,257	28.16	–13.61
Total valid votes		18,667	98.69	
Total rejected ballots		248	1.31	+0.43
Turnout		18,915	71.26	+3.89
Eligible voters		26,545		
Progressive Conservative gain from Co-operative Commonwealth		Swing		+0.04
Source: Elections Ontario

1948 Ontario general election
Party	Candidate	Votes	%	±%
Co-operative Commonwealth	George Isaac Harvey	6,514	41.77	+7.08
Progressive Conservative	Wesley W. Hill	5,081	32.58	–1.03
Liberal	Wylie A. Rodman	4,000	25.65	–6.05
Total valid votes		15,595	99.12	
Total rejected ballots		138	0.88	–0.03
Turnout		15,733	67.36	–6.82
Eligible voters		23,355		
Co-operative Commonwealth hold		Swing		+4.05
Source: Elections Ontario

1945 Ontario general election
Party	Candidate	Votes	%	±%
Co-operative Commonwealth	George Isaac Harvey	5,623	34.69	–21.00
Progressive Conservative	William J. McMeekin	5,447	33.61	+13.13
Liberal	Thomas McGee	5,138	31.70	+7.87
Total valid votes		16,208	99.10	
Total rejected ballots		148	0.90	+0.22
Turnout		16,356	74.18	+9.09
Eligible voters		22,049		
Co-operative Commonwealth hold		Swing		–17.07
Source: Elections Ontario

1943 Ontario general election
Party	Candidate	Votes	%	±%
Co-operative Commonwealth	George Isaac Harvey	7,173	55.70	–
Liberal	Colin Campbell	3,069	23.83	–
Progressive Conservative	Earl Dinsmore	2,637	20.48	–
Total valid votes		12,879	99.31	
Total rejected ballots		89	0.69	–
Turnout		12,968	65.09	–
Eligible voters		19,924		
Co-operative Commonwealth gain from Liberal		Swing		–
Source: Elections Ontario

Ontario provincial by-election, November 23, 1937 Resignation of Richard McMeekin to provide a seat for Campbell
Party	Candidate	Votes
Liberal	Colin Campbell	acclaimed
Source: Elections Ontario

1937 Ontario general election
Party	Candidate	Votes	%	±%
Liberal	Richard McMeekin	7,134	49.47	–5.99
Conservative	James W. Lyons	6,488	44.99	+2.87
Co-operative Commonwealth	Herman J. Lefave	798	5.53	+3.13
Total valid votes		14,420	98.70	
Total rejected ballots		190	1.30	+0.15
Turnout		14,610	77.42	–0.52
Eligible voters		18,871		
Liberal hold		Swing		–4.43
Source: Elections Ontario

1934 Ontario general election
Party	Candidate	Votes	%	±%
Liberal	Augustus Roberts	7,530	55.47	+32.98
Conservative	James W. Lyons	5,719	42.13	–35.39
Co-operative Commonwealth	George Curry	327	2.41	–
Total valid votes		13,576	98.85	
Total rejected ballots		158	1.15	–0.21
Turnout		13,734	77.94	+26.39
Eligible voters		17,621		
Liberal gain from Conservative		Swing		+34.19
Source: Elections Ontario

1929 Ontario general election
Party	Candidate	Votes	%	±%
Conservative	James W. Lyons	6,216	77.52	+0.14
Liberal	Ernest L. DeCourcy	1,803	22.48	–
Total valid votes		8,019	98.63	
Total rejected ballots		111	1.37	+0.53
Turnout		8,130	51.55	+12.59
Eligible voters		15,770		
Conservative hold		Swing		+0.07
Source: Elections Ontario

1926 Ontario general election
Party	Candidate	Votes	%	±%
Conservative	James W. Lyons	5,497	77.38	–
Prohibitionist	James Bertram Cunningham	1,607	22.62	–
Total valid votes		7,104	99.16	
Total rejected ballots		60	0.84	–
Turnout		7,164	38.96	–
Eligible voters		18,387		
Conservative hold		Swing		–
Source: Elections Ontario

Ontario provincial by-election, August 16, 1923 Ministerial by-election, upon appointment as Minister of Lands and Forests
Party	Candidate	Votes
Conservative	James W. Lyons	acclaimed
Source: Elections Ontario

1923 Ontario general election
Party	Candidate	Votes	%	±%
Conservative	James W. Lyons	2,839	43.27	+2.38
Liberal	John Alexander McPhail	2,395	36.50	–
Labour	James Bertram Cunningham	1,327	20.23	–38.89
Total valid votes		6,561	98.84	
Total rejected ballots		77	1.16	–1.09
Turnout		6,638	43.28	–29.32
Eligible voters		15,339		
Conservative gain from Labour		Swing		+1.19
Source: Elections Ontario

1919 Ontario general election
Party	Candidate	Votes	%	±%
Labour	James Bertram Cunningham	4,444	59.11	–
Conservative	William Howard Hearst	3,074	40.89	–20.03
Total valid votes		7,518	97.75	
Total rejected ballots		173	2.25	+1.20
Turnout		7,691	72.59	+13.93
Eligible voters		10,595		
Labour gain from Conservative		Swing		–
Source: Elections Ontario

1914 Ontario general election
Party	Candidate	Votes	%	±%
Conservative	William Howard Hearst	2,231	60.92	–
Liberal	Francis Edward Crawford	1,431	39.08	–
Total valid votes		3,662	98.95	
Total rejected ballots		39	1.05	–
Turnout		3,701	58.66	–
Eligible voters		6,309		
Conservative hold		Swing		–
Source: Elections Ontario

1911 Ontario general election
Party	Candidate	Votes
Conservative	William Howard Hearst	acclaimed
Source: Elections Ontario

1908 Ontario general election
Party	Candidate	Votes	%	±%
Conservative	William Howard Hearst	1,406	54.69	+6.74
Liberal	Charles Napier Smith	1,165	45.31	–6.74
Total valid votes		2,571	99.27	
Total rejected ballots		19	0.73	–0.74
Turnout		2,590	61.43	+5.70
Eligible voters		4,216		
Conservative gain from Liberal		Swing		+6.74
Source: Elections Ontario

1905 Ontario general election
Party	Candidate	Votes	%	±%
Liberal	Charles Napier Smith	1,396	52.05	–3.41
Conservative	M. McFadden	1,286	47.95	+3.41
Total valid votes		2,682	98.53	
Total rejected ballots		40	1.47	+1.47
Turnout		2,722	55.73	–
Eligible voters		4,884		
Liberal hold		Swing		–3.41
Source: Elections Ontario

Ontario provincial by-election, October 27, 1903 Void election
Party	Candidate	Votes	%	±%
Liberal	Charles Napier Smith	1,254	55.46	+9.41
Conservative	Andrew Miscampbell	1,007	44.54	–9.41
Total valid votes		2,261	100.00	
Total rejected ballots		–		
Turnout		2,261	–	–
Eligible voters				
Liberal gain from Conservative		Swing		+9.41
Source: Elections Ontario

1902 Ontario general election
Party	Candidate	Votes	%
Conservative	Andrew Miscampbell	1,359	53.95
Liberal	Charles Napier Smith	1,160	46.05
Total valid votes		2,519	99.80
Total rejected ballots		5	0.20
Turnout		2,524	51.69
Eligible voters		4,883	
Conservative pickup new district.			
Source: Elections Ontario

== 2007 electoral reform referendum ==
2007 Ontario electoral reform referendum
Side	Votes	%
First Past the Post	22,830	73.79
Mixed member proportional	8,110	26.21
Total valid votes	30,940	100.00

== See also ==
- List of Ontario provincial electoral districts
- Canadian provincial electoral districts

== Sources ==
- Elections Ontario
  - 1999 results
  - 2003 results
  - 2007 results
- Centennial Edition of a History of the Electoral Districts, Legislatures and Ministries of the Province of Ontario 1867-1967
- Map of riding for 2018 election
