= Grandview Gardens =

Grandview Gardens may refer to:

- Daguanyuan or Grand View Garden, a fictitious garden in the Chinese classic novel Dream of the Red Chamber
- Grandview Gardens, West Virginia, an unincorporated community in West Virginia
- Grandview Gardens, Ontario, one of the neighbourhoods of Sault Ste. Marie, Ontario
