= James W. Lyons =

Canadian politician

James Lyons

MPP for Sault Ste. Marie
- In office June 25, 1923 – May 16, 1934
- Preceded by: James Bertram Cunningham
- Succeeded by: Augustus Roberts

Personal details
- Born: August 26, 1878 Virginia, Ontario, Canada
- Died: September 10, 1947 (aged 69)
- Party: Conservative

James Winfield Lyons (August 26, 1878 – September 10, 1947) was a politician in the Canadian province of Ontario, who served in the Legislative Assembly of Ontario from 1923 to 1934. Born in Virginia, Ontario, he married Angelina Hodgson in Toronto in 1898, and moved his growing family to Steelton, Ontario (later merged with Sault Ste. Marie) soon after the turn of the century. He served as mayor of Steelton and later of Sault Ste. Marie itself. He represented the electoral district of Sault Ste. Marie as a member of the Conservatives, and served as Minister of Lands and Forests in the government of Howard Ferguson from 1923 to 1926. As minister, his major contribution was the creation of the Ontario Provincial Air Service in 1924.

After starting his working life in construction, Lyons established Lyons Fuel and Supply Company Limited in Sault Ste. Marie in 1912. Following his death, his sons took over the business. His eldest son, Harry, represented Sault Ste. Marie in the Legislative Assembly from 1951 until his death in 1962.
