= Canadian pipe mine =

Type of WWII landmine

The Canadian pipe mine, also known as the McNaughton tube, was a type of landmine deployed in Britain during the invasion crisis of 1940–1941. It comprised a horizontally bored pipe packed with explosives, and once in place this could be used to instantly create an anti-tank obstacle or to ruin a road or runway thereby denying its use by an enemy.

== Inception ==
In November 1939 Lieutenant-General Andrew McNaughton travelled to Toronto for a meeting with Lieutenant-Colonel Charles Hertzberg (Commanding Royal Engineers, CRE) and Lieutenant-Colonel Guy R. Turner, both of the 1st Canadian Infantry Division, Oliver Hall of the Mining Association of Ontario, and Colin Campbell, an experienced mining and construction engineer and Minister of Public Works under Ontario Premier Mitchell Hepburn. The meeting participants discussed military possibilities raised by experimental diamond drilling, an initiative that had been broached by R.A. Bryce, president of the Ontario Mining Association, among others. McNaughton recognized the possibility of placing explosives under fortifications or introducing poison gas into them for military use.

McNaughton visited the Premier of Ontario, Mitchell Hepburn, who had served with the Royal Air Force during the First World War. Although he now suffered some disability he wished to serve in Europe in the new conflict. "He decided that he was sufficiently well to go in the capacity of A.D.C. to the G.O.C. 1st Canadian Division and as such he proposed himself to me—not only proposed himself but did everything in the world to get me to take him. But I finally convinced him that it was his duty to stay in Canada and put ginger into the mobilization. I did tell him that I wanted his Minister of Public Works in charge of a special section of tunnellers and so we finally compromised; I swapped the Premier of Ontario as an A.D.C. for the Minister of Public Works [Colin Campbell] as the nucleus of a very useful engineering organization". (Note: McNaughton quoted by Swettenham.)

As he prepared Canadian forces for departure to Britain, McNaughton proposed that a section of the 12th Field Company, Royal Canadian Engineers should be formed from experienced diamond drillers. He said: "We will start in a small way to see what is in the scheme and then expand if the results warrant it". (Note: McNaughton quoted by Swettenham.) McNaughton offered the command to Colin Campbell. Campbell accepted and initiated plans to obtain recruits from the mining districts of northern Ontario.

McNaughton, now General Officer Commanding (GOC) of the 1st Canadian Infantry Division, travelled to Britain with his staff and the bulk of his division in December 1939. Early in January 1940 McNaughton inspected the Allied defences in northern France and on a four-day inspection of the Maginot Line he found defences to be unsatisfactory. He requested – and received – working drawings of fortifications so that his diamond drillers could help clear out German defenders if they captured portions of these areas.

At a meeting with senior British engineers at Aldershot, McNaughton suggested that the pipes might be used to construct surprise obstacles in front of a German advance. This would be accomplished by pushing pipes into the ground at a shallow angle and packing them with explosives ready to be detonated. The pipe could be easily and quickly pushed by a hydraulic jack fitted to a tank transporter, numbers of which were available. According to McNaughton's biographer, John Swettenham, he got the idea of using hydraulic jacks from the bootleggers of Windsor, Ontario who, during the prohibition, pushed pipes from a brewery to other premises where drink could be safely loaded.

== Development ==
Colin Campbell and his section of diamond drillers arrived in England in February 1940. They started experimenting in a quarry near Aldershot. Campbell proved that his section could produce surprise obstacles that could not be crossed by a tank during a demonstration at Bourley Hill. Attendees promised to support McNaughton's proposal to expand the section into a tunnelling company.

In May 1940, McNaughton assigned the tunnelers a role in preparing defences in England and in May advised the War Office that "the detachment of 1 Canadian Tunnelling Company, intended for experimental work in France, should not now be sent but should be held for more important experimental work in England." (Note: McNaughton quoted by Swettenham.) With the fall of France, the tunnellers were employed in anti-invasion measures. McNaughton noticed that ditches were being dug across unused airstrips to deny their use by the enemy, even though the bombing of active airfields might make them urgently needed in the near future. By 18 June the Chief Engineer, Home Forces and the Inspector General of Fortifications were convinced of the benefits of the pushed pipes filled with explosives and set out to acquire large quantities of pipe for the purpose of destroying runways at short notice. By the end of that month, the tunnelers successfully demonstrated "surprise" anti-tank obstacles near Shornmead Fort, Chatham.

The drills and pipe pushing machines were used to bury a series of 3-inch (76 mm) diameter pipes, each at a shallow angle, to a maximum depth of about 8 feet (2.4 m). Each pipe was about 55 feet (17 m) long, and they were placed at intervals of 25 feet (7.6 m) in an overlapping pattern such that the lower end of the first pipe would end up about 15 feet underground; the next pipe would then be pushed into the ground behind the first so that the upper end of that pipe would overlap with the lower end of the earlier pipe. The pipes were packed with explosives which when detonated would produce a very effective anti-tank obstacle about 28 feet (8.5 m) wide and 8 feet (2.4 m) deep with loose soil at the bottom. This ditch would be sufficient to either stop a tank altogether or to force it be exposed to anti-tank weapons for several minutes as it effected a crossing. Pipe pushing machines were used to drill into the approaches to bridges or embankments and left ready for instantaneous demolition.

Originally known as the Canadian Pipe Mine, it was later named the McNaughton Tube Tank Obstacle in honour of the commander of the Canadian Corps, Lieutenant-General Andrew McNaughton.

On 9 August 1940, "McNaughton's secret A/T obstacle" was demonstrated to General Alan Brooke, Commander-in-Chief, Home Forces, and, as such, responsible for defence of the UK. By October 1940, the Canadian engineers were in demand, and plans being made to train additional British units to install the devices. 179 Special Tunnelling Company of the Royal Engineers was formed, and about 40,000 feet (12 km) of the obstacle were installed – requiring some 90 tonnes of explosives.

== Tactical use ==
A secret report emphasised the value of this obstacle:

The quality of surprise renders the obstacle of particular value in influencing the enemy's plan. Its use enables the enemy to be induced to stage his attack at a point where there is an apparent gap in the Anti-Tank defence while at the same time retaining the ability to stop him.

It is of particular value in the last minute construction of road blocks after the passage of our troops.

It must be emphasised that surprise is the chief characteristic of this obstacle not speed.

Conventional anti-tank obstacles were very obvious from the air. These pipe mines had the advantage of being virtually invisible from the air, and so could be used when the enemy had been coaxed into a seemingly weak point in the defences. Furthermore, the mines could be set in place without interference to the normal use of the land, and so they were deployed under roads and railways that might need to be blocked in an instant, and runways that may need to be denied to the enemy at short notice.

== Problems ==
McNaughton's tubes were found to have significant defects. Blasting gelatine explosives were expected to remain potent for several years, but in 1941 it was evident that the explosives in some of the tubes had been affected by water, losing power significantly. A brass spearhead on a long rod was provided for withdrawing the explosives from the tubes, but in some cases the explosive had deteriorated into a porridge-like mush. Second Lieutenant Cameron, who as a civilian was an experienced oil drilling engineer, suggested washing out the explosives with water delivered by a narrow diameter tube pushed down the main pipe. The mush, along with globules of nitro-glycerine, was caught in burlap bags for disposal. The original pipes were then re-charged with stable explosives.

After the end of the war, Canadian pipe mine installations were removed. However, a small number were missed and rediscovered many years later. It was necessary to deal with discovered mines with great care. In April 2006, 20 unexploded pipe mines were discovered under a runway at a former Royal Navy air base, HMS Daedalus, Lee-on-Solent, Hampshire. The original 265 mines were each 60 feet (18 m) long. The 20 discovered mines were packed with 2,400 pounds (1,100 kg) of explosive. Their removal, thought to be the largest of its kind in peacetime Britain, led to the evacuation of some 900 homes staggered over a 5-week period. The mines were destroyed by controlled explosion.

== See also ==
- Bangalore torpedo
- British anti-invasion preparations of the Second World War
- British hardened field defences of World War II
- Camouflet
