= Thomas Dean (Canadian politician) =

Canadian politician (1857–1929)

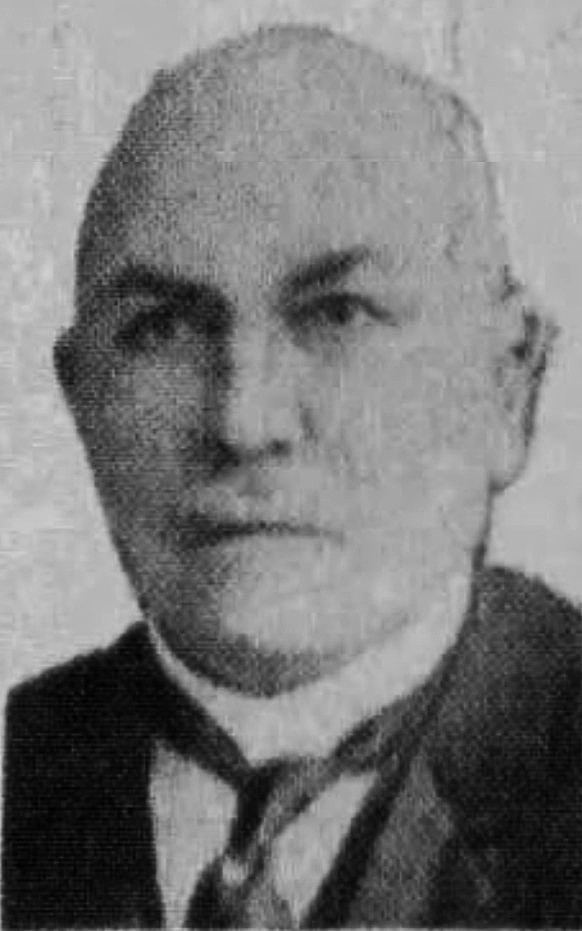

5th Mayor of the City of Sault Ste. Marie, Ontario
- In office August 15, 1918 – January 1919
- Preceded by: Francis Edward Crawford
- Succeeded by: George A. Boyd

Personal details
- Born: Thomas Dean; 5 February 1857 Cooksville, Ontario, Canada
- Died: 24 May 1929 (aged 72) Sault Ste. Marie, Ontario
- Spouse(s): Mary Jane Mutchmor Hannah Fisher (m. 1909)
- Children: 3
- Profession: Homestead Inspector and Crown land agent

Thomas Dean (February 5, 1857 – May 24, 1929) was a Canadian politician who served as the fifth mayor of the city of Sault Ste. Marie. He was the first mayor elected by council to fulfill the unexpired portion of a predecessor's term. He also served as a councillor on Manitoulin Island and reeve of St. Joseph Island.

== Early life ==
Dean was born on February 5, 1857, in Cooksville, Ontario to Elizabeth Graham and John Dean, Irish immigrants to Canada. His family moved to Mulmur, near Sherborne, Ontario when he was about seven years old where they were farmers.

In 1878, in his early 20s he moved to Manitoulin Island to take up his own farm. He later went into the lumber business buying cedar posts and ties from settlers and selling them for use in the construction of railroads.

In 1893 he and his young family moved west to St. Joseph Island where he opened and operated a large store.

In 1900 the family moved to Sault Ste. Marie where Dean worked as an inspector for the Algoma Central Railway for two years before returning to the lumber business. In 1908 the provincial government appointed him homestead inspector in the region. In this role he identified parcels of land suitable for settlement and farming, and investigated to ensure that lands allocated for such purposes were being developed, instead of being held for speculation.

== Municipal politics ==
Dean had been involved in local politics before coming to Sault Ste. Marie. He was a councillor on Manitoulin Island and served as reeve of St. Joseph Island for three terms during which he brought telephone service to island residents.

Dean was first elected to Sault Ste. Marie's town council in the January 1905 election, placing fourth in a field of ten candidates for six at-large seats. He served for one year-long term.

Nine years later, Dean ran for city council in January 1914 on a slogan of “progressive city government” but fell a few votes short of election. As was the practice by law at the time, as the candidate who had earned the most votes without being elected, Dean was appointed to council in August when an alderman resigned to take a city job. He was re-elected in 1915. In 1916 the city council adopted a ward system and Dean ran and was elected in Ward 2, narrowly edging out former mayor William H. Munro.

He was acclaimed in the ward in 1917 and returned in the 1918 election.

On August 12, 1918, Mayor Francis Crawford announced his intention to resign to become the city's first permanent assessor. The following evening, for the first time in its short history, the city council conducted an election of its own to choose a new mayor. Dean and two other sitting aldermen were nominated. The remaining council members elected Dean as mayor for the remaining four and a half months of the council's term. At noon on August 15, the city clerk formally swore Dean in as the city's fifth mayor.

Among the matters Dean had to contend with as mayor was the influenza epidemic that reached the city that fall. By November, thirty-one city residents had died from the illness and 150 houses were under quarantine. The local health board, of which Dean was a member took extraordinary measures to control the illness. In mid-October schools, theatres, places of worship, dance halls and public gatherings we all closed. Ferry service to Michigan was ordered suspended and examinations were conducted of people boarding and disembarking from trains. The board later ordered an end to in-home deliveries as well. By mid-December, the board of health had reported the hospitals clear with only 15 cases in quarantine. Dean was able to move a resolution at council lifting the epidemic control measures.

That month, Dean announced his intention to run for re-election in the 1919 municipal election. The end of the Great War had been declared only weeks earlier and the city was beginning to imagine post-war reconstruction and prosperity. Reflecting that mood, in an open letter in The Sault Daily Star, Dean pledged that “wherever possible, ‘Progress’ and ‘Economy’ will be my watchwords for the forthcoming year should I again hold office as your Mayor” adding that “I am convinced that labor and capital must work together in order to serve the best possible needs of both; and it will be my fixed policy to advance in every way in my power, the interest of both so as to encourage industry and progress for this city of which we are all so proud.”

Dean faced two opponents in the January 6, 1919 election—Ward 1 alderman George Boyd and T. H. Baker. The results did not go in Dean's favour. He lost to George Boyd by 102 votes. Dean blamed his loss on inaccurate reporting by the media of the business of city hall.

While he never again ran for council, Dean continued to be involved in civic affairs. He served on the board of the city's water and light commission and volunteered as chairman of the city's parks board.

== Post-political career ==
In November 1920 the province named him Crown land agent combining this with the homestead inspector role he had held for the previous 12 years.

== Personal life ==
In the mid-1880s, Dean married Mary Jane Mutchmor, the youngest daughter of a Manitoulin Island lumber merchant. The couple had three children—two sons, John Franklin, and Thomas Norman, and a daughter, Altimyra who died in infancy. Mary Jane died on July 11, 1905, of anaemia at age 41. Her remains were taken to her parents' home in Hamilton, Ontario and then to her birthplace of Caledonia for interment.

Following his wife's death, Dean told others that he planned to leave his sons with their grandparents to finish school while he would sell off his assets in Sault Ste. Marie and relocate to Hamilton or back to his hometown of Shelburne to go into business. However he continued to reside in Sault Ste. Marie.

On June 14, 1909, he married his second wife, Hannah Fisher, a designer in Sault Ste. Marie, Michigan. Hannah lived to age 100, and on her birthday in May 1967, Canada's centennial year, was feted as “Sault Ste. Marie’s only Centennial year centenarian.”

== Death and tributes ==
Dean died at his home on Queen Street East on the afternoon of May 24, 1929 at age 72. His funeral was held four days later at St. Andrews United Church. His remains were interred at Greenwood Cemetery.

The Sault Daily Star eulogized him as “a kind and sympathetic friend” who was “interested in every movement for the betterment of his fellow man and the interests of this district”
