= Algoma West =

Former federal electoral district in Ontario, Canada

Ontario electoral district

Defunct federal electoral district
- Legislature: House of Commons
- District created: 1903
- District abolished: 1966
- First contested: 1904
- Last contested: 1965

Algoma West was a federal electoral district in Ontario, Canada, that was represented in the House of Commons of Canada from 1904 to 1968. It was created in 1903 from parts of Algoma riding.

The west riding of Algoma was defined to consist of the portion of the territorial district of Algoma lying west of Algoma East riding.

The electoral district was abolished in 1966 when it was redistributed between Algoma, Cochrane, Sault Ste. Marie and Timmins—Chapleau ridings. Algoma West was created in 1903 from Algoma, and was abolished in 1966 into Algoma and Sault Ste. Marie.

== Members of Parliament ==
This riding elected the following members of the House of Commons of Canada:

Parliament	Years	Member	Party
Riding created from Algoma
10th	1904–1908	Arthur Cyril Boyce	Conservative
11th	1908–1911	Arthur Cyril Boyce	Conservative
12th	1911–1917	Arthur Cyril Boyce	Conservative
13th	1917–1921	Thomas Edward Simpson	Government (Unionist)
14th	1921–1925	Thomas Edward Simpson	Conservative
15th	1925–1926	Thomas Edward Simpson	Conservative
16th	1926–1930	Thomas Edward Simpson	Conservative
17th	1930–1935	Thomas Edward Simpson	Conservative
18th	1935–1940	Henry Sidney Hamilton	Liberal
19th	1940–1945	George E. Nixon	Liberal
20th	1945–1949	George E. Nixon	Liberal
21st	1949–1953	George E. Nixon	Liberal
22nd	1953–1957	George E. Nixon	Liberal
23rd	1957–1958	George E. Nixon	Liberal
24th	1958–1962	George E. Nixon	Liberal
25th	1962–1963	George E. Nixon	Liberal
26th	1963–1965	George E. Nixon	Liberal
27th	1965–1968	George E. Nixon	Liberal
Riding dissolved into Algoma and Sault Ste. Marie

== Election results ==
1904 Canadian federal election
Party	Candidate	Votes
Conservative	Arthur Cyril Boyce	1,675
Liberal	J. J. Kehoe	1,580

1908 Canadian federal election
Party	Candidate	Votes
Conservative	Arthur Cyril Boyce	2,079
Liberal	Robert James Gibson	1,870

1911 Canadian federal election
Party	Candidate	Votes
Conservative	Arthur Cyril Boyce	2,738
Liberal	Charles Napier Smith	2,180

1917 Canadian federal election
Party	Candidate	Votes
Government (Unionist)	Thomas Edward Simpson	4,780
Opposition (Laurier Liberals)	Charles Napier Smith	2,510
Labour	James Lockwood	658

1921 Canadian federal election
Party	Candidate	Votes
Conservative	Thomas Edward Simpson	4,279
Liberal	Henry Sidney Hamilton	3,565
Progressive	Thomas Farquhar	2,822

1925 Canadian federal election
Party	Candidate	Votes
Conservative	Thomas Edward Simpson	6,767
Liberal	Thomas John McCauley	3,574

1926 Canadian federal election
Party	Candidate	Votes
Conservative	Thomas Edward Simpson	7,171
Liberal–Labour	Albert Ernest Whytall	4,187

1930 Canadian federal election
Party	Candidate	Votes
Conservative	Thomas Edward Simpson	7,531
Liberal	Albert Ernest Whytall	6,108

1935 Canadian federal election
Party	Candidate	Votes
Liberal	Henry Sidney Hamilton	6,788
Conservative	Ernest Victor McMillan	4,844
Co-operative Commonwealth	Albert Edward Headrick	1,669
Liberal	Albert Reid Wood	1,180
Reconstruction	Vincent Hector Prewer	252

1940 Canadian federal election
Party	Candidate	Votes
Liberal	George E. Nixon	8,632
National Government	John L. Lang	5,612
Co-operative Commonwealth	Harry P. Waite	2,196

1945 Canadian federal election
Party	Candidate	Votes
Liberal	George E. Nixon	7,476
Progressive Conservative	Harold Scott Trefry	5,619
Co-operative Commonwealth	Lloyd George Shepherd	4,281

1949 Canadian federal election
Party	Candidate	Votes
Liberal	George E. Nixon	10,127
Progressive Conservative	Arthur Allison Wishart	5,056
Co-operative Commonwealth	Richard Wellington Johns	4,716

1953 Canadian federal election
Party	Candidate	Votes
Liberal	George E. Nixon	10,461
Progressive Conservative	James Sydney Foulds	5,571
Co-operative Commonwealth	John G. Barker	4,428

1957 Canadian federal election
Party	Candidate	Votes
Liberal	George E. Nixon	10,166
Progressive Conservative	Henry M. Lang	8,345
Co-operative Commonwealth	Harvey Claude Willoughby	5,027

1958 Canadian federal election
Party	Candidate	Votes
Liberal	George E. Nixon	12,390
Progressive Conservative	Henry Lang	11,355
Co-operative Commonwealth	Lorne D. Callahan	4,801

1962 Canadian federal election
Party	Candidate	Votes
Liberal	George E. Nixon	13,832
Progressive Conservative	Henry Lang	9,681
New Democratic	Morris Wernick	8,274

1963 Canadian federal election
Party	Candidate	Votes
Liberal	George E. Nixon	14,023
Progressive Conservative	Charles Eaid	10,119
New Democratic	Morris Wernick	9,351
Social Credit	Ronald James Ash	355

1965 Canadian federal election
Party	Candidate	Votes
Liberal	George E. Nixon	12,034
Progressive Conservative	Russ Ramsay	11,914
New Democratic	Erhart Regier	9,564

== See also ==
- List of Canadian electoral districts
- Historical federal electoral districts of Canada
