= Demolition vehicle =

Vehicle used to demolish buildings

A demolition vehicle is a vehicle used to demolish buildings and other structures.

Military forces require such vehicles to clear obstacles, fortifications and rubble so that they can safely advance. Military engineers may use a variety of specialised vehicles including armoured bulldozers and explosive robotic drones.

== History ==
The first being the prototypes of explosive robotic drones of Aubriot-Gabet 'land torpedoes' invented in France in 1915 and the Crocodile Schneider-Creusot, 20 examples were put into service with the 2nd French Army in July 1915.

Examples used during the Second World War include the German Goliath, the AVRE variant of the Churchill tank and the Centaur bulldozer. The Israel Defence Forces developed armoured bulldozers such as the IDF Caterpillar D9 in the 1950s and has used these with success in several of its conflicts.

Specialist demolition vehicles may be used by civilian contractors. Volvo produce a range of tracked vehicles equipped with lengthy hydraulic arms and a variety of attachments including drills, grabs, pincers and scoops.

== Gallery ==
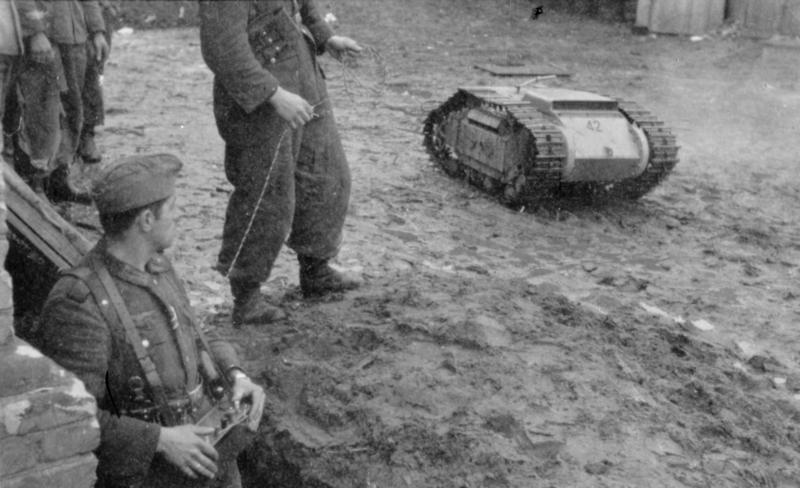
A Goliath remote-piloted demolition charge being used in Russia in 1944

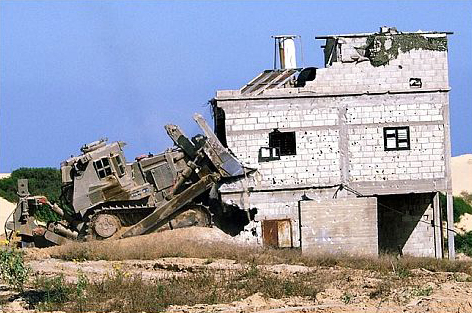
An IDF D9 demolishing a house in the Gaza Strip during the Second Intifada

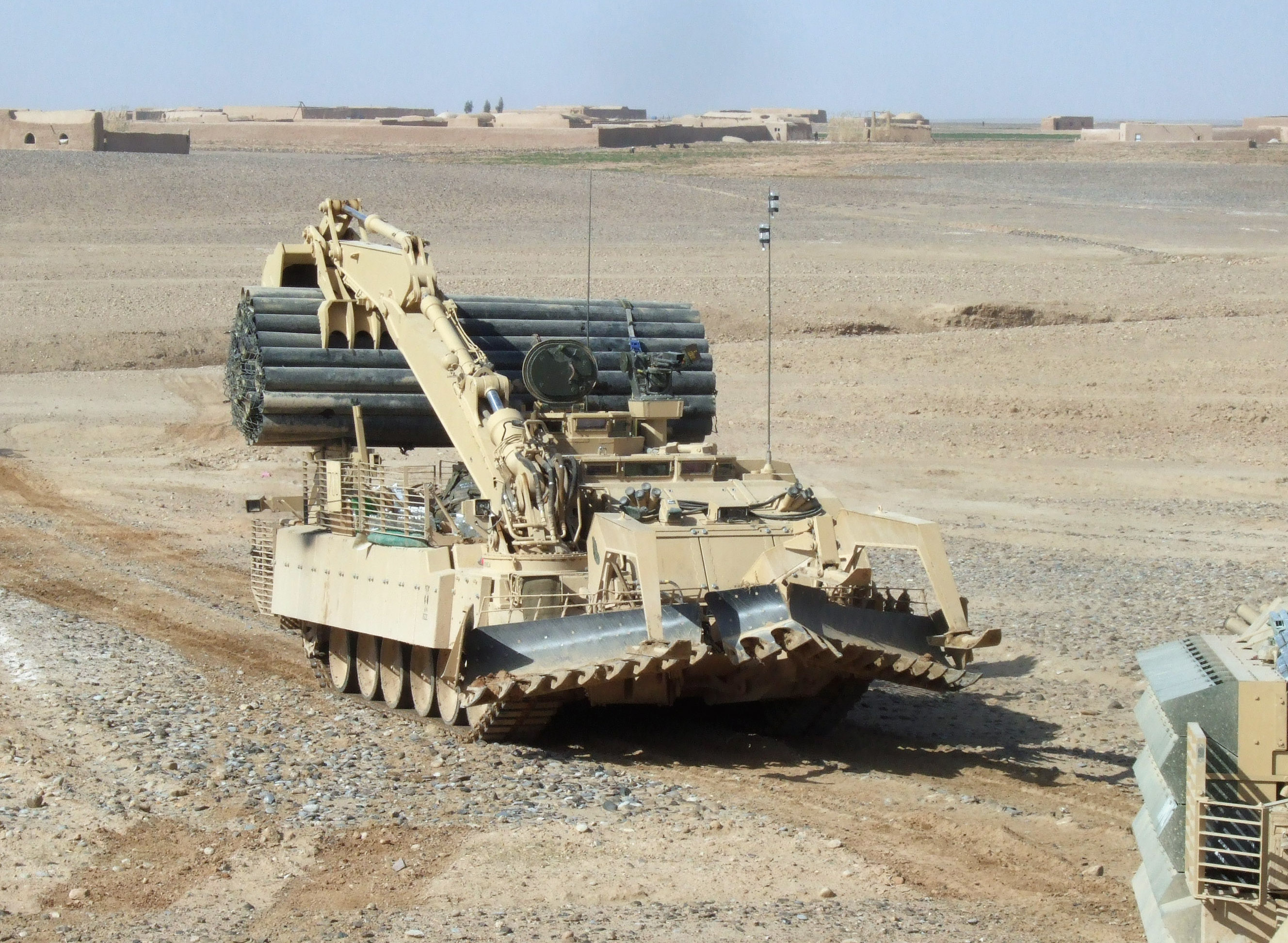
A Trojan AVRE in Helmand Province

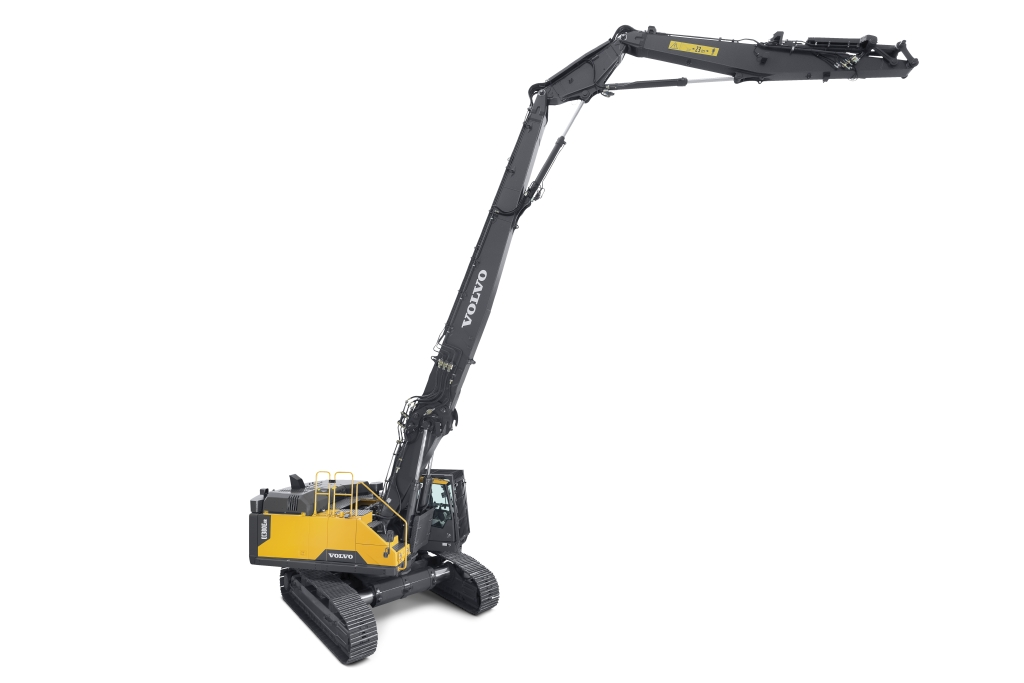
A Volvo EC480EHR high reach demolition machine

== See also ==
- Demolition belt
