= David Orazietti =

Canadian politician (born 1968)

The Honourable David Orazietti ECO
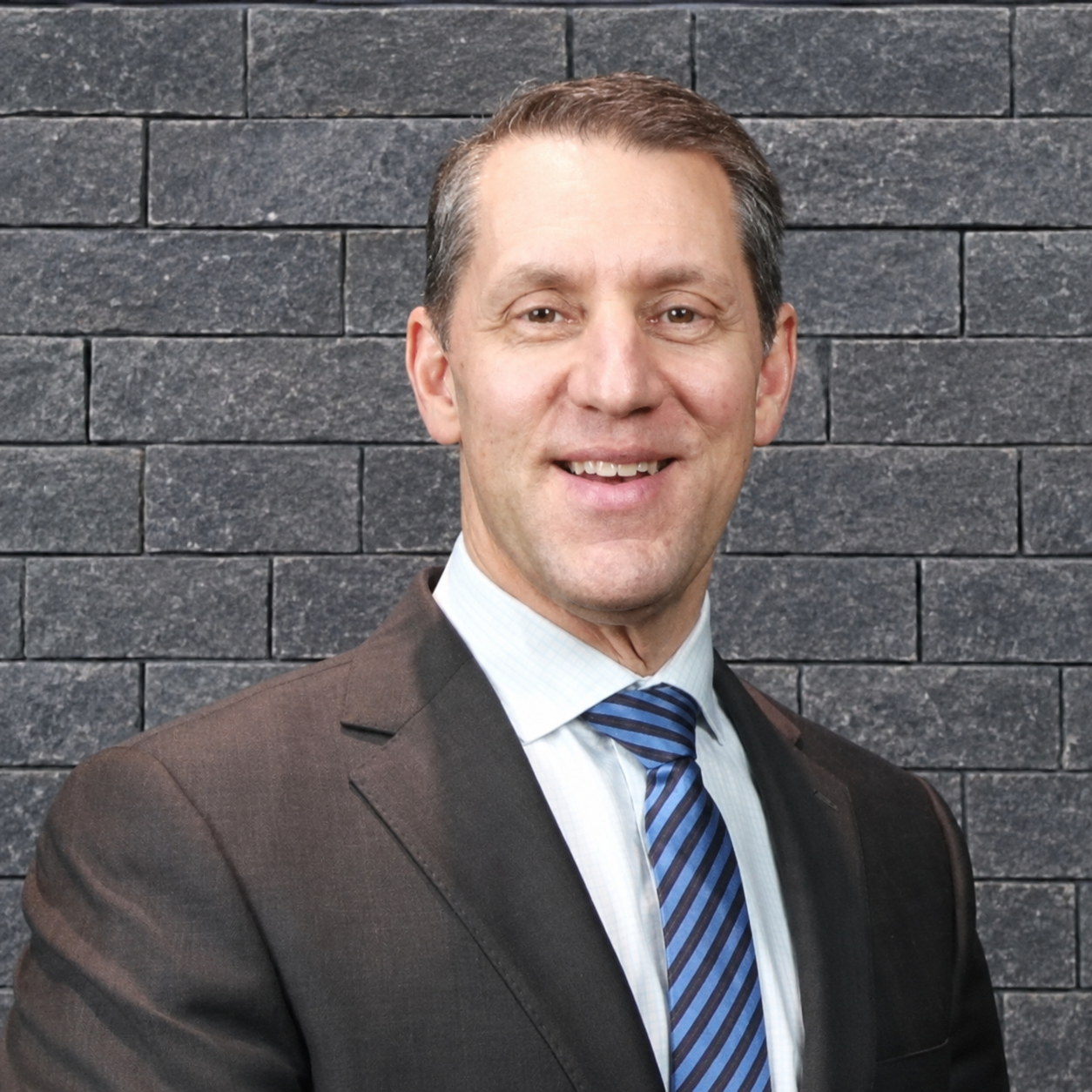

Ontario MPP for Sault Ste. Marie
- In office 2 October 2003 – 1 January 2017
- Preceded by: Tony Martin
- Succeeded by: Ross Romano

Personal details
- Born: 12 November 1968 (age 57) Sault Ste. Marie, Ontario, Canada
- Party: Liberal
- Spouse: Jane Orazietti
- Children: 2
- Occupation: Teacher

David Michael Orazietti (born 12 November 1968) is a former politician in Ontario, Canada. He was a Liberal member of the Legislative Assembly of Ontario from 2003 to 2016 who represented the northern Ontario riding of Sault Ste. Marie. He served in the cabinet of Kathleen Wynne, most recently as Minister of Community Safety and Correctional Services, until he resigned on 31 December 2016. His resignation became effective 1 January 2017. In January 2017, Orazietti was appointed Dean of Aviation, Trades and Technology, Natural Environment and Business at Sault College.

== Background ==
Orazietti is a third-generation resident of Sault Ste. Marie, Ontario. He worked as a teacher for the Algoma District School Board for ten years. He and his wife Jane live in Sault Ste. Marie with their two children.

== Politics ==
In 1997, Orazietti was elected to Sault Ste. Marie City Council in Ward One. He was re-elected to a second term in 2000.

He ran in the provincial election of 2003 as the Liberal candidate in the riding of Sault Ste. Marie. He defeated New Democratic incumbent Tony Martin by 8,671 votes. He was re-elected in the 2007, 2011, and 2014 elections, becoming the first MPP in the riding's history to be re-elected three times.

During his time in government Orazietti held several Parliamentary Assistant roles supporting ministers of cabinet including Minister of Natural Resources (2005-2007, 2009-2011) and Minister of Northern Development and Mines (2007-2009). He also served as Government Caucus Chair and parliamentary assistant to premier Dalton McGuinty from 2011 to 2013.

During his tenure, he brought forward several Private member bills to improve such things as the Northern Health Travel Grant and expansion of Highway 17.

On 11 February 2013, Premier Kathleen Wynne appointed him to cabinet as Minister of Natural Resources. On 24 June 2014, Wynne appointed him to a second ministry, this time as Minister of Government and Consumer Services.

On 27 May 2015 Orazietti introduced a new bill called Protecting Condominium Owners Act, 2015. The bill called for the creation of a new Condominium Authority that would facilitate dispute resolution between owners and boards. There would also be training and licensing of condominium management companies. Critics of the bill said that the bill would result in increased fees and more special assessments. It was passed into law on 3 December 2015.

On 13 June 2016, Wynne appointed Orazietti as Minister of Community Safety and Correctional Services. He resigned from cabinet on 16 December 2016 and announced his resignation as an MPP effective 1 January 2017.

== After politics ==
Orazietti was appointed Dean of Aviation, Trades and Technology, Natural Environment and Business at Sault College in January 2017.

In July 2023, David Orazietti was selected as president of Sault College following a Canada wide search competition. He served in this role during significant financial challenges and a dramatic decline of international students across the sector driven by both federal and provincial policy. In October 2025 he made a personal decision to retire from Sault College.

=== Cabinet positions ===
Wynne ministry, Province of Ontario (2013–2018)
Cabinet posts (3)
Predecessor	Office	Successor
Yasir Naqvi	Minister of Community Safety and Correctional Services; 2016 (June–December)	Marie-France Lalonde
Tracy MacCharles	Minister of Government and Consumer Services; 2014–2016	Marie-France Lalonde
Michael Gravelle	Minister of Natural Resources; 2013–2014	Bill Mauro

=== Provincial electoral record ===
2014 Ontario general election
Party	Candidate	Votes	%	±%
Liberal	David Orazietti	17,490	58.53	+3.59
New Democratic	Celia Ross	7,611	25.47	-5.40
Progressive Conservative	Rod Fremlin	3,703	12.39	+0.56
Green	Kara Flannigan	965	3.23	+1.46
Libertarian	Austin Williams	115	0.38	

2011 Ontario general election
Party	Candidate	Votes	%	±%
Liberal	David Orazietti	16,104	54.94	-5.21
New Democratic	Celia Ross	9,047	30.87	+4.48
Progressive Conservative	Jib Turner	3,467	11.83	+4.58
Green	Luke MacMichael	519	1.77	-2.55
Family Coalition	Matthew Hunt	172	0.59	-1.3

2007 Ontario general election
Party	Candidate	Votes	%	±%
Liberal	David Orazietti	19,313	60.15	+3.11
New Democratic	Jeff Arbus	8,474	26.39	-5.96
Progressive Conservative	Josh Pringle	2,329	7.25	-0.26
Green	André Riopel	1,386	4.32	+3.07
Family Coalition	Bill Murphy	605	1.89	+0.17

2003 Ontario general election
Party	Candidate	Votes	%	±%
Liberal	David Orazietti	20,050	57.04	+29.45
New Democratic	Tony Martin	11,379	32.37	-10.86
Progressive Conservative	Bruce Willson	2,674	7.61	-20.79
Family Coalition	Al Walker	606	1.72	
Green	Dan Brosemer	441	1.25	
