= Richard McMeekin =

Canadian politician

MPP for Sault Ste. Marie
- In office October 6 – October 20, 1937
- Preceded by: Augustus Roberts
- Succeeded by: Colin Campbell

Personal details
- Born: February 1, 1878 Blandford-Blenheim, Ontario
- Died: November 20, 1960 (aged 82) Sault Ste. Marie, Ontario, Canada
- Party: Liberal

Richard M. McMeekin (February 1, 1878 – November 20, 1960) was a politician in the Canadian province of Ontario, who served in the Legislative Assembly of Ontario in 1937. He represented the electoral district of Sault Ste. Marie as a member of the Ontario Liberal Party.

McMeekin won the seat in the 1937 election. However, after just two weeks in office, he resigned to open a seat for former federal MP Colin Campbell to enter provincial politics in a by-election, after Campbell was defeated in the district of Frontenac-Addington on election day. Prior to his election to the legislature, McMeekin served two years as mayor of Sault Ste. Marie.
