= Tony Martin (politician) =

Canadian politician

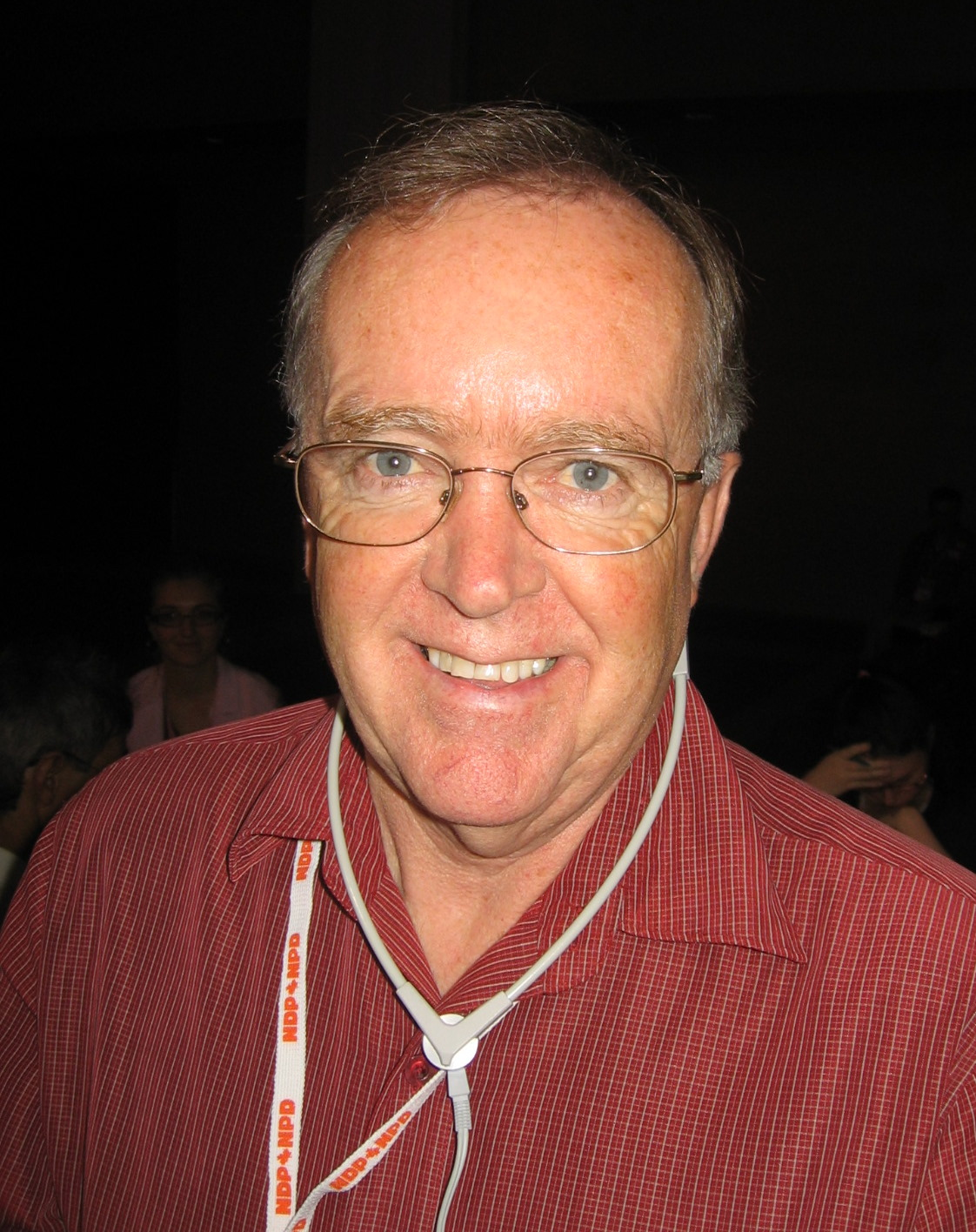

Member of Parliament for Sault Ste. Marie
- In office June 28, 2004 – May 2, 2011
- Preceded by: Carmen Provenzano
- Succeeded by: Bryan Hayes

Member of the Ontario Provincial Parliament for Sault Ste. Marie
- In office September 6, 1990 – October 2, 2003
- Preceded by: Karl Morin-Strom
- Succeeded by: David Orazietti

Personal details
- Born: August 31, 1948 (age 78) Drogheda, County Louth, Ireland
- Party: New Democratic
- Spouse: Anna (Celetti) Martin
- Children: 4
- Profession: Businessman, community-development worker

Anthony A. Martin (born August 31, 1948) is a Canadian politician. He was a member of the Legislative Assembly of Ontario from 1990 to 2003, representing the constituency of Sault Ste. Marie for the Ontario New Democratic Party (NDP). He subsequently served in the House of Commons of Canada, representing Sault Ste. Marie from 2004 until 2011.

== Background ==
Martin was raised in Wawa, Ontario, and received a Bachelor of Arts degree from Laurentian University in 1974. Later in the same year, he received a Diploma in Recreational Leadership from Confederation College. He was the founder of the Sault Ste. Marie Soup Kitchen, and was for some time the owner and General Manager of Transcend Homes, a local workers' cooperative. A devout Roman Catholic, Martin also served as a trustee on the Northern District Catholic School Board and was a pastoral assistant at the Blessed Sacrament Parish in Sault Ste. Marie from 1981 to 1990.

Martin is married to Anna Celetti. They have four children.

On February 9, 2014, Martin was hospitalized in Sault Ste. Marie after suffering a stroke.

== Provincial politics ==
Martin ran for the Ontario legislature in the provincial election of 1990 after Karl Morin-Strom, the sitting Member of Provincial Parliament (MPP) for Sault Ste. Marie, announced his retirement. He faced a difficult challenge in retaining the seat for his party. The Ontario Liberal Party ran a strong candidate in Don MacGregor, while the upstart anti-bilingualism Confederation of Regions Party made strong inroads into the riding's anglophone/working-class base, which traditionally voted NDP. After a late drive from the city's unions, Martin defeated MacGregor by a slim 697-vote margin. Elsewhere in the province, the NDP won several historical breakthroughs and formed government for the first time in its history.

In his first term as an MPP, Martin was appointed as parliamentary assistant to the Minister of Education. He held this position for the next five years. The NDP government, under the leadership of Premier Bob Rae (with significant help from MPPs Shelley Martel of Nickel Belt and Bud Wildman of Algoma), facilitated a unique restructuring at Algoma Steel in Sault Ste. Marie that included majority worker ownership during the early 1990s. This contributed to Martin retaining the riding in the 1995 election with an increased majority, even as the NDP suffered major losses in most parts of the province. Martin defeated Liberal challenger Carmen Provenzano by almost 4,000 votes, and so became one of only seventeen New Democrats to return to the legislature. The Progressive Conservatives under Mike Harris replaced the NDP's majority government with one of their own in 1995.

Martin again retained his seat in the 1999 election. He was appointed as one of the legislature's Deputy Speakers on October 25, 1999. He dramatically resigned from this position on December 19, 2000, to protest the Mike Harris government's inactivity on poverty issues. Following this, he chaired a series of "People's Parliament on Poverty" meetings. In 2002–03, Martin supported Bill Blaikie's campaign to lead the federal NDP.

Martin was initially expected to be re-elected in the 2003 provincial election, but a late surge in Liberal support saw David Orazietti win the seat by a significant margin.

== Federal politics ==
Shortly after his provincial defeat, Martin was nominated as the federal NDP's candidate for the general election of 2004.

Sault Ste. Marie's vulnerable industrial economy and strong union base and the NDP's populist strength in Northern Ontario made the riding a prime target for the party. Martin won by almost 1,000 votes, once again defeating incumbent Liberal Carmen Provenzano, who had taken the seat in the 1997 election. Martin was re-elected in the 2006 campaign, as the NDP increased its representation from 19 seats to 29. Martin won his third term federally in the 2008 snap election as the NDP won 37 seats.

In the NDP's shadow cabinets under the leadership of Jack Layton, Martin served as critic for Social Policy, Childcare, Human Resources and Skills Development, and the FedNor agency. Martin lost his seat to challenger Bryan Hayes of the Conservative Party of Canada in the 2011 federal election.

== Electoral record ==
=== Provincial ===
1990 Ontario general election: Sault Ste. Marie
| Party | Candidate | Votes | % |
|---|---|---|---|
| New Democratic | Anthony Martin | 14,036 | 36.26 |
| Liberal | Don Macgregor | 13,339 | 34.46 |
| Confederation of Regions | Donald Edwards | 7,991 | 20.64 |
| Progressive Conservative | John Solski | 3,347 | 8.65 |
| Total valid votes | | 38,713 | 100.00 |
| Rejected, unmarked and declined ballots | | 386 | |
| Turnout | | 39,099 | 68.26 |
| Electors on the lists | | 57,281 | |

1995 Ontario general election: Sault Ste. Marie
| Party | Candidate | Votes | % |
|---|---|---|---|
| New Democratic | Tony Martin | 15,392 | 43.33 |
| Liberal | Carmen Provenzano | 11,672 | 32.86 |
| Progressive Conservative | Lou Turco | 7,699 | 21.68 |
| Green | Paul Thompson | 757 | 2.13 |
| Total valid votes | | 35,520 | 100.00 |
| Rejected, unmarked and declined ballots | | 321 | |
| Turnout | | 35,841 | 62.24 |
| Electors on the lists | | 57,581 | |

1999 Ontario general election: Sault Ste. Marie
| Party | Candidate | Votes | % |
|---|---|---|---|
| New Democratic | Tony Martin | 15,949 | 43.23 |
| Progressive Conservative | James Caicco | 10,477 | 28.40 |
| Liberal | Terry Sheehan | 10,180 | 27.59 |
| Natural Law | Colleen Hibbs | 288 | 0.78 |
| Total valid votes | | 36,894 | 100.00 |
| Rejected, unmarked and declined ballots | | 252 | |
| Turnout | | 37,146 | 62.07 |
| Electors on the lists | | 59,841 | |

2003 Ontario general election: Sault Ste. Marie
| Party | Candidate | Votes | % |
|---|---|---|---|
| Liberal | David Orazietti | 20,050 | 64.37 |
| New Democratic | Tony Martin | 11,379 | 36.53 |
| Progressive Conservative | Bruce Wilson | 2,674 | 8.58 |
| Family Coalition | Al Walker | 606 | 1.95 |
| Green | Dan Brosemer | 441 | 1.42 |
| Total valid votes | | 31,150 | 100.00 |
| Rejected, unmarked and declined ballots | | 199 | |
| Turnout | | 35,349 | 61.10 |
| Electors on the lists | | 57,857 | |

=== Federal ===
2004 Canadian federal election: Sault Ste. Marie (federal electoral district)
| Party | Candidate | Votes | % | ±% |
|---|---|---|---|---|
| New Democratic | Tony Martin | 16,512 | 38.29 | – |
| Liberal | Carmen Provenzano | 15,760 | 36.55 | – |
| Conservative | Cameron Ross | 9,969 | 23.12 | – |
| Green | Julie Emmerson | 814 | 1.89 | – |
| Total valid votes | | 43,372 | | |
| Turnout (%) | | 63.4 | | |
| New Democratic notional gain | | Swing | | – |

2006 Canadian federal election: Sault Ste. Marie (federal electoral district)
| Party | Candidate | Votes | % | ±% |
|---|---|---|---|---|
| New Democratic | Tony Martin | 17,979 | 38.88 | +0.59 |
| Liberal | Christian Provenzano | 15,825 | 34.22 | -2.33 |
| Conservative | Ken Walker | 11,099 | 24.00 | +0.88 |
| Green | Mark Viitala | 1,056 | 2.28 | +0.39 |
| First Peoples National | Guy Dumas | 225 | 0.49 | +0.49 |
| Marxist–Leninist | Mike Taffarel | 59 | 0.13 | +0.13 |
| Total valid votes | | 46,435 | | |
| Turnout (%) | | 67.8 | | |
| New Democratic hold | | Swing | | – |

2008 Canadian federal election: Sault Ste. Marie (federal electoral district)
| Party | Candidate | Votes | % | ±% |
|---|---|---|---|---|
| New Democratic | Tony Martin | 16,572 | 40.43 | +1.55 |
| Conservative | Cameron Ross | 15,461 | 37.72 | +13.72 |
| Liberal | Paul Bichler | 6,870 | 16.76 | -17.46 |
| Green | Luke Macmichael | 1,774 | 4.33 | +2.05 |
| First Peoples National | Cory McLeod | 235 | 0.57 | +0.08 |
| Marxist–Leninist | Mike Taffarel | 81 | 0.20 | +0.07 |
| Total valid votes | | 41,158 | | |
| Turnout (%) | | 59.4 | | |
| New Democratic hold | | Swing | | – |

2011 Canadian federal election: Sault Ste. Marie (federal electoral district)
| Party | Candidate | Votes | % | ±% |
|---|---|---|---|---|
| Conservative | Bryan Hayes | 18,328 | 41.44 | +3.72 |
| New Democratic | Tony Martin | 16,467 | 37.23 | -3.20 |
| Liberal | Christian Provenzano | 8,343 | 18.86 | +2.1 |
| Green | Luke Macmichael | 945 | 2.14 | -2.19 |
| Christian Heritage | Randy Riahka | 111 | 0.25 | +0.25 |
| Marxist–Leninist | Mike Taffarel | 38 | 0.09 | -0.11 |
| Total valid votes | | 44,460 | | |
| Turnout (%) | | 64.2 | | |
| Conservative gain | | Swing | | – |
