= George Isaac Harvey =

Canadian politician (1892–1973)

Member of Provincial Parliament
- In office August 4, 1943 – October 6, 1951
- Preceded by: Colin Campbell
- Succeeded by: Harry Lyons
- Constituency: Sault Ste. Marie

Personal details
- Born: November 29, 1892 Chatham, Kent, England
- Died: December 13, 1973 (aged 81)
- Party: Ontario CCF
- Spouse: Olive Jarrett

George Isaac Harvey (November 29, 1892 – December 13, 1973) was a politician in the Canadian province of Ontario, who served in the Legislative Assembly of Ontario from 1943 to 1951. He represented the electoral district of Sault Ste. Marie as a member of the Co-operative Commonwealth Federation (CCF).
