= Charles Napier Smith =

Canadian politician

MPP for Sault Ste. Marie
- In office October 27, 1903 – April 14, 1908
- Preceded by: Andrew Miscampbell
- Succeeded by: William Hearst

Personal details
- Born: January 14, 1866 Tapleytown, Canada West
- Died: October 29, 1919 (aged 53) Sault Ste. Marie, Ontario
- Party: Liberal

Charles Napier Smith (January 14, 1866 – October 29, 1919) was a politician in the Canadian province of Ontario, who served in the Legislative Assembly of Ontario from 1903 to 1908. He represented the electoral district of Sault Ste. Marie as a member of the Ontario Liberal Party. He died in 1919.
