= George E. Nixon =

Canadian politician

Official 1966 portrait

George Ewart Nixon (9 March 1898 – 17 March 1981) was a Canadian politician. He represented the electoral district of Algoma West in the House of Commons of Canada from 1940 to 1968. He was a member of the Liberal Party.

Parliament of Canada
Preceded by Henry Sidney Hamilton	Member of Parliament for Algoma West; 1940–1968	Succeeded by last member, riding abolished in 1966
