= William H. Munro =

Canadian politician (1860–1918)

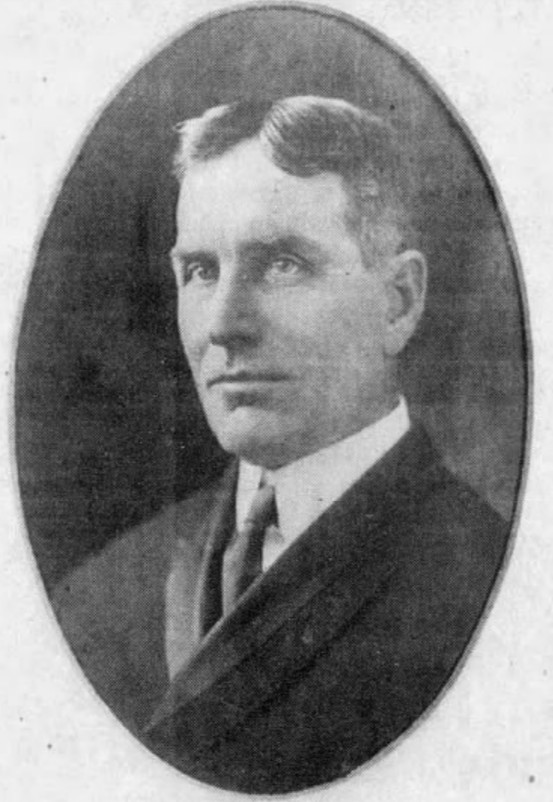

1st Mayor of the City of Sault Ste. Marie, Ontario
- In office April 16, 1912 – January 13, 1913
- Preceded by: office created
- Succeeded by: Thomas Edward Simpson

25th Mayor of the Town of Sault Ste. Marie, Ontario
- In office January 9, 1911 – April 16, 1912
- Preceded by: Thomas Edward Simpson
- Succeeded by: office abolished

Personal details
- Born: 7 August 1860 Appleton, Ontario, Canada
- Died: 17 January 1918 (aged 57) Sault Ste. Marie, Ontario
- Spouse: Catherine Munro (nee Morrison)
- Children: 2 sons (Gerald, Kenneth Harold)

William Hilliard Munro (August 7, 1860 – January 17, 1918) was a Canadian politician who was the first mayor of the city of Sault Ste. Marie, Ontario.

== Background ==
Munro was born August 7, 1860, in Appleton, Ontario — today, Mississippi Mills — the third son of John and Sarah Munro, Lanark County farmers.

A machinist, he moved to Sault Ste. Marie in 1896 to serve as a mechanical advisor to industrialist Francis Clergue. For a time he was superintendent of Algoma Iron Works, a foundry and machine shop Clergue established to build equipment for his paper plant and other industries. He was later employed as the district's inspector of public roads for the government of Ontario. In this capacity, he brought the first large truck to Sault Ste. Marie, which played a role in its development by helping to move people and materials around the community.

== Municipal politics ==
Munro served seven one-year terms as a Sault Ste. Marie town councillor and two terms as its mayor.

He was first elected to town council in 1902 and reelected in 1903, 1905, 1906, 1907, 1909 and 1910.

He was elected town mayor in 1911 and reelected in 1912. In that role, he led the initiative to have the town incorporated as a city, petitioning the provincial government for the change. The Act to incorporate the City of Sault Ste. Marie was assented to on April 16, 1912, and provided that the existing town council headed by Mayor Munro would become the first council of the new city until the end of its term early the following year.

Munro served another four terms as a city alderman, being elected to one year terms in 1913, 1914, 1917 and 1918. He ran for mayor in the 1915 election but lost to lawyer John Alexander McPhail.

== Disappearance and death ==
Munro vanished mysteriously one evening in early 1918. His disappearance captured newspaper headlines and resulted in an international search that involved police as far west as Alberta.

At around 7:30 p.m. on January 17, Munro left his home at 138 East Street for an evening out. He was seen leaving the Franklin House hotel in Sault Ste. Marie, Michigan for home later that night. Munro flagged down a bus and asked to be taken to the river where a row boat was operating as a ferry over a break in the ice during the winter months. The bus driver told him that the ferry had stopped operating for the night. Munro was not seen again.

His disappearance alarmed the community. Fearing that he could have attempted to cross the river and fallen through the ice, a search party was organized by police on both sides of the river. There having been no witnesses to his disappearance or body found, he continued to be presumed missing. News of the former mayor's disappearance was carried through both countries and gripped readers of newspapers in Montreal, Ottawa, Lansing, Battle Creek, Brandon, Kingston, and Moncton.

Eventually the search widened to Alberta, based on the idea that Munro could have had interests in the province. More than a week after his disappearance, the Edmonton Journal reported that a $100 reward had been posted and that police in the city were looking for Munro, described as “six feet tall, large stature and erect, and wearing a blue suit with a hairline white stripe” covered by a long black chinchilla overcoat and a peaked sealskin cap with ear flaps. Another area newspaper wildly speculated that “the missing man may have lost his memory, wandered west and became ill from a nervous breakdown.”

Three months having passed, in May 1918 the city council declared Munro's ward two seat vacant and elected a replacement to fulfill the remainder of his term.

On August 18, seven months after he went missing, a boater discovered Munro's remains on the St. Marys River. Still in his fur coat, Munro's body surfaced near the government dock on the Canadian side. The coroner, aided by Thomas Simpson, Munro's successor as mayor, and an undertaker himself, positively identified the partially decomposed body from his clothing and effects in his pockets. The coroner listed Munro's cause of death as a drowning that occurred January 17, 1918.

A funeral was held for him at city hall the morning following his body being recovered. Despite there having been no public announcement, the service was well attended by the community and officials.

An editorial in The Sault Daily Star said "Mr. Munro occupied a unique place in the hearts of his townsmen, as was apparent from his practically continuous service on council since 1902, and the memories of his kindly nature as well as his eminent public services will not soon be forgotten."

Munro was buried near his birthplace at St. Fillon's Cemetery in Beckwith, Lanark County, Ontario.

== Personal life ==
On June 9, 1886, Munro was married to Catherine Morrison in Carleton Place, Ontario. The couple had two sons. Their son Gerald was an ice hockey player who played two seasons in the National Hockey League.

Catherine continued to live in Sault Ste. Marie after her husband's passing, running a beauty parlour at 667 Queen Street East. She collapsed of a heart attack on Queen Street West around 6:30 in the evening of November 24, 1928 and was pronounced dead. Accompanied by her son, Gerald, her remains were transported to Carleton Place, where she was interred with her husband.

== Electoral Results ==
=== Mayor of the Town of Sault Ste. Marie ===
The town council was elected to a one-year term each January.

1911 Sault Ste. Marie municipal election, Mayor
Candidate	Total votes	% of total votes
William H. Munro	558	42.7
G. A. Boyd	446	34.1
J. Stevenson	304	23.2
Total valid votes	1,308	100.00

1912 Sault Ste. Marie municipal election, Mayor
Candidate	Total votes	% of total votes
William H. Munro	716	57.7
J. Stevenson	524	42.3
Total valid votes	1,240	100.00

=== Mayor of the City of Sault Ste. Marie ===
The city council was elected to a one-year term each January.

1915 Sault Ste. Marie municipal election, Mayor
Candidate	Total votes	% of total votes
J. A. McPhail	954	55.4
William H. Munro	769	44.6
Total valid votes	1,723	100.00
