= Ross Romano =

Canadian politician (born 1979)

The Honourable Ross Romano ECO
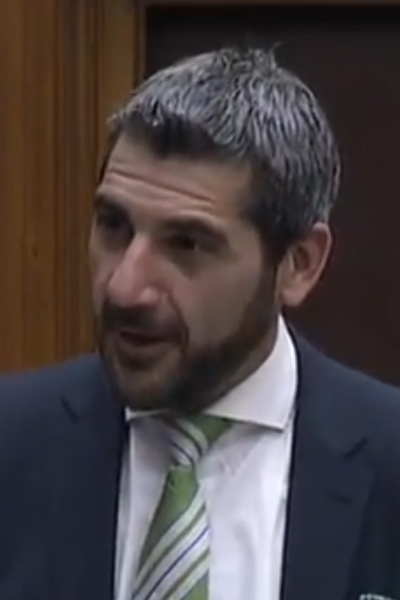
- Romano speaking during the Members' Statements in 2018

Ontario Chief Government Whip
- In office June 30, 2022 – January 28, 2025
- Premier: Doug Ford
- Preceded by: Lorne Coe

Ontario Minister of Government and Consumer Services
- In office June 18, 2021 – June 24, 2022
- Premier: Doug Ford
- Preceded by: Lisa Thompson
- Succeeded by: Kaleed Rasheed

Ontario Minister of Colleges and Universities
- In office June 20, 2019 – June 18, 2021
- Premier: Doug Ford
- Preceded by: Merrilee Fullerton
- Succeeded by: Jill Dunlop

Member of the Ontario Provincial Parliament for Sault Ste. Marie
- In office June 1, 2017 – January 28, 2025
- Preceded by: David Orazietti
- Succeeded by: Chris Scott

Sault Ste. Marie City Councillor
- In office December 1, 2014 – June 12, 2017
- Preceded by: Frank Manzo
- Succeeded by: Ozzie Grandinetti
- Constituency: Ward 6

Personal details
- Born: October 13, 1979 (age 47)
- Party: Progressive Conservative
- Occupation: Politician; lawyer

Rosario "Ross" Romano (born 1979) is a Canadian politician who served as Chief Government Whip in the Legislative Assembly of Ontario. A member of the Progressive Conservative (PC) Party, Romano held a number of portfolios since the PCs formed government in 2018, including as minister of government and consumer services, and minister of colleges and universities. He represented the riding of Sault Ste. Marie until 2025.

== Political career ==
A lawyer by profession, Romano began his political career upon being elected to the Sault Ste. Marie City Council in 2014. He was first elected to the Ontario Legislature on June 1, 2017, in a by-election called due to the retirement of the riding's previous MPP, David Orazietti, thus becoming the first Conservative to represent the district in 32 years.

Romano was re-elected on June 7, 2018, with a 1.29% advantage over Michele McCleave-Kennedy.

In November 2018, he came under fire for comments made during a debate on funding certain take-home cancer medications, comparing the cost of funding the additional treatments to children wanting both toys and ice cream. He withdrew the comments the next day.

He was appointed Minister of Training, Colleges and Universities in June 2019, championing initiatives such as provincial support for microcredentials. During his tenure, Laurentian University declared insolvency and filed for creditor protection.

Romano was shuffled to the Ministry of Government and Consumer Services in June 2021. He presided over the launch of Ontario's new online Business Registry, which aimed to shift many paper-based processes to digital ones. Its launch was difficult, punctuated with "system shutdowns, technical glitches and substantive problems". One media outlet described it as a disaster, with some law firms telling their clients to avoid the creation or use of Ontario corporate entities so as not to put business transactions at risk.

In June 2022, Romano won re-election with an increased margin over NDP challenger Michele McCleave-Kennedy amid a decline of some 10% in voter turnout. Shortly thereafter, he was removed from his position as Minister of Government and Consumer Services as part of a post-election cabinet shuffle. He was named Government Whip later that month.

In December 2024, he announced that he would not be seeking reelection, and would retire from provincial politics at the end of his current term to spend more time with his family.

== Awards and honours ==
In June 2024, Romano was recognized with the Distinguished Alumni Award from his undergraduate alma mater Algoma University, which at the time of his attendance was an affiliated college of Laurentian.

== Electoral record ==
2022 Ontario general election: Sault Ste. Marie
Party	Candidate	Votes	%	±%	Expenditures
Progressive Conservative	Ross Romano	12,606	46.89	+4.86	$49,426
New Democratic	Michele McCleave-Kennedy	10,029	37.30	–3.43	$78,662
Liberal	Liam Hancock	1,610	5.99	–3.97	$0
Independent	Naomi Sayers	1,070	3.98	–	$2,001
New Blue	Shane Pankhurst	894	3.33	–	$1,690
Green	Keagan Gilfillan	675	2.51	–0.74	$381
Total valid votes/expense limit		26,884	99.47	–	$85,145
Total rejected, unmarked and declined ballots		143	0.53	–0.48	
Turnout		27,027	44.49	–10.00	
Eligible voters		60,748			
Progressive Conservative hold		Swing		+4.15	
Source: Elections Ontario

2018 Ontario general election: Sault Ste. Marie
Party	Candidate	Votes	%	±%
Progressive Conservative	Ross Romano	13,498	42.03	+1.66
New Democratic	Michele McCleave-Kennedy	13,084	40.74	+7.92
Liberal	Jaclynne Hamel	3,199	9.96	–13.05
Green	Kara Flannigan	1,044	3.25	+1.26
Northern Ontario	Sandy Holmberg	993	3.09	
Libertarian	Lance Brizard	299	0.93	+0.65
Total valid votes		32,117	100.0	
Total rejected, unmarked and declined ballots				
Turnout			54.79	
Eligible voters		58,616		
Progressive Conservative hold		Swing		–3.13
Source: Elections Ontario

Ontario provincial by-election, June 1, 2017 Resignation of David Orazietti
Party	Candidate	Votes	%	±%
Progressive Conservative	Ross Romano	10,411	40.37	+27.98
New Democratic	Joe Krmpotich	8,465	32.82	+7.63
Liberal	Debbie Amaroso	5,935	23.01	–35.57
Green	Kara Flannigan	512	1.98	–1.25
None of the Above	Above Znoneofthe	313	1.21	
Libertarian	Gene Balfour	71	0.28	–0.10
Pauper	John Turmel	47	0.18	
Total valid votes		25,785	100.0	
Turnout			43.93	
Registered electors		58,690		
Progressive Conservative gain from Liberal		Swing		+10.14
Source: Elections Ontario
