= Augustus Roberts =

Canadian politician

MPP for Sault Ste. Marie
- In office June 19, 1934 – August 25, 1937
- Preceded by: James Lyons
- Succeeded by: Richard McMeekin

Personal details
- Born: December 2, 1890 Port de Grave, Dominion of Newfoundland
- Died: January 7, 1952 (aged 61) Toronto, Ontario, Canada
- Party: Liberal
- Occupation: Physician

Augustus Duncan Roberts (December 2, 1890 – January 7, 1952) was a politician in the Canadian province of Ontario, who served in the Legislative Assembly of Ontario from 1934 to 1937. He represented the electoral district of Sault Ste. Marie as a member of the Ontario Liberal Party. He was a physician.
