= Harry Lyons (politician) =

Canadian politician

MPP for Sault Ste. Marie
- In office November 22, 1951 – September 4, 1962
- Preceded by: George Isaac Harvey
- Succeeded by: Arthur Wishart

Personal details
- Born: Clayton Harry Lyons; January 8, 1900 Virginia, Ontario
- Died: September 4, 1962 (aged 62) Sault Ste Marie, Ontario
- Party: Progressive Conservative
- Relations: James Lyons, father

Clayton Harry Lyons (January 8, 1900 – September 4, 1962),Harry Lyons, was an Ontario politician who served in the Legislative Assembly of Ontario from 1951 to 1962. He represented the electoral district of Sault Ste. Marie as a member of the Progressive Conservatives.

Lyons was the oldest child of James Lyons, who also served as MPP for the same district from 1923 to 1934, and at one time as the Minister of Lands and Forests.

At age 16, during the First World War, he enlisted as a private in the 227th Battalion of the Canadian Expeditionary Force and served in Europe.

Before his election to the Legislative Assembly, Lyons ran the family business, Lyons Fuel and Supply Company Limited, in Sault Ste. Marie.

He died in office in 1962 and was succeeded by Arthur Wishart in the 1963 election.
