= Chris Scott (politician) =

Canadian politician (born 1989/90)

Chris Scott MPP

Member of the Ontario Provincial Parliament for Sault Ste. Marie
- Incumbent
- Assumed office February 27, 2025
- Preceded by: Ross Romano

Personal details
- Born: 1989 or 1990 (age 36–37)
- Party: Independent (2025–present)
- Other political affiliations: Progressive Conservative (before 2025)
- Education: Carleton University (BA)

Christopher Allen Winfield van Scott (born 1989 or 1990) is a Canadian politician who has served as the member of Provincial Parliament (MPP) for Sault Ste. Marie in the Legislative Assembly of Ontario since 2025. Initially elected as a member of the Progressive Conservative Party, he was removed from caucus in September 2025 and now sits as an independent. Scott previously served as a special advisor to Premier Doug Ford's chief of staff.

== Education ==
Scott graduated from Carleton University with a bachelor of arts degree in political science and government.

== Political career ==
Before his election, Scott worked in the office of his predecessor, PC MPP Ross Romano, and later as a special advisor to the premier’s chief of staff. He was selected by Progressive Conservative leader Doug Ford as the party’s candidate for the 2025 provincial election in Sault Ste. Marie, a decision that bypassed the usual local nomination process. Romano served as his campaign manager.

In the election, Scott won by a margin of 118 votes over NDP candidate Lisa Vezeau-Allen, the closest result in the riding in more than a century.

=== Arrest ===
On September 22, 2025, Scott was arrested by the Toronto Police Service on an out-of-town warrant. The Sault Ste. Marie Police Service allege that Scott assaulted his wife with a high chair on September 19, resulting in charges of assault and assault with a weapon. Following his arrest, Scott was removed from the Progressive Conservative caucus and now sits as an independent. Scott was caught having a romantic relationship with a staff member just days before he allegedly assaulted his wife with a high chair.

=== Calls for resignation ===
Following his arrest, Scott has faced widespread public pressure to resign from his position as MPP. The Ontario New Democratic Party demanded Scott’s immediate resignation, describing the situation as "incredibly troubling", Ontario NDP Leader Marit Stiles stated that Sault Ste. Marie needs a full-time representative and called on Scott to resign. Sault Ste. Marie Mayor Matthew Shoemaker publicly urged Scott to step down "for the betterment of our city". The SooToday Editorial Board published an editorial titled "Chris Scott: It's time for you to go away," calling for his resignation, and the paper published several letters to the editor from residents calling for him to do the same. Additional calls for resignation have come from advocacy group Angie’s Angels, ethics professor Stephen Maguire, and the Ontario Federation of Labour.
