= Arthur Cyril Boyce =

Canadian politician

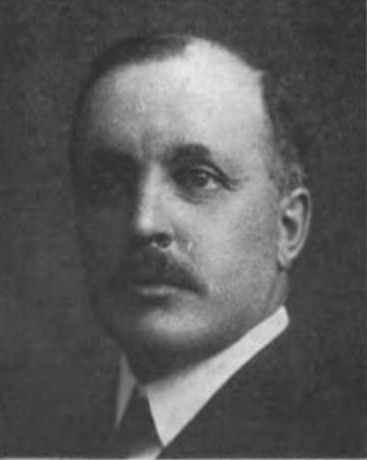

Member of the Canadian Parliament for Algoma West
- In office 1904–1917
- Preceded by: District created in 1903
- Succeeded by: Thomas Edward Simpson

Personal details
- Born: September 12, 1867 Wakefield, Yorkshire, England
- Died: August 4, 1942 (aged 74) Toronto, Ontario
- Party: Conservative

Arthur Cyril Boyce (September 12, 1867 – August 4, 1942) was a Canadian politician.

Born in Wakefield, West Yorkshire, England, Boyce was educated at private educational institutions in Wakefield, York and Carlisle, England, and Osgoode Hall Law School, Toronto. A lawyer, he practised law in Port Arthur (1890–1892), Rat Portage (1893–1903) and in Sault Ste. Marie.

He represented the electoral district of Algoma West in the House of Commons of Canada from 1904 to 1917, during which time he became involved in the case of Angelina Napolitano, a Sault Ste. Marie woman who became the first in Canada to use the battered woman defence. He was a member of the Conservative Party.

He died in Toronto on August 4, 1942.
