= Henry Sidney Hamilton =

Canadian politician

Lieutenant Colonel Henry S. Hamilton, Q.C.
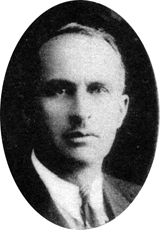

Member of Parliament for Algoma West
- In office October 1935 – March 1940
- Preceded by: Thomas Edward Simpson
- Succeeded by: George E. Nixon

Personal details
- Born: 28 January 1887 Sault Ste. Marie, Ontario
- Died: 10 February 1976 (aged 89) Sault Ste. Marie, Ontario
- Party: Liberal
- Spouse(s): Lorraine Irwin m. 22 Jul 1917
- Profession: Barrister, lawyer

Henry Sidney Hamilton (28 January 1887 – 10 February 1976) was a Canadian politician. He represented the electoral district of Algoma West in the House of Commons of Canada from 1935 to 1940. He was a member of the Liberal Party. He was also a former member of the Canadian Expeditionary Force, attaining the rank Lieutenant-Colonel. He died at Plummer Memorial Hospital in Sault Ste. Marie in 1976.
