= James Bertram Cunningham =

Canadian politician

James Cunningham

MPP for Sault Ste. Marie
- In office October 20, 1919 – May 10, 1923
- Preceded by: William Hearst
- Succeeded by: James Lyons

Personal details
- Born: September 28, 1872 Thornton, Ontario
- Died: 1941
- Party: Labour

James Bertram Cunningham (September 28, 1872 – 1941) was a politician in the Canadian province of Ontario, who served in the Legislative Assembly of Ontario from 1919 to 1923. He represented the electoral district of Sault Ste. Marie as a member of the Labour Party, and served in the United Farmers of Ontario-Labour coalition government of Ernest Charles Drury.
