= Colin Campbell (Ontario politician) =

Canadian politician

Brigadier General Colin Campbell
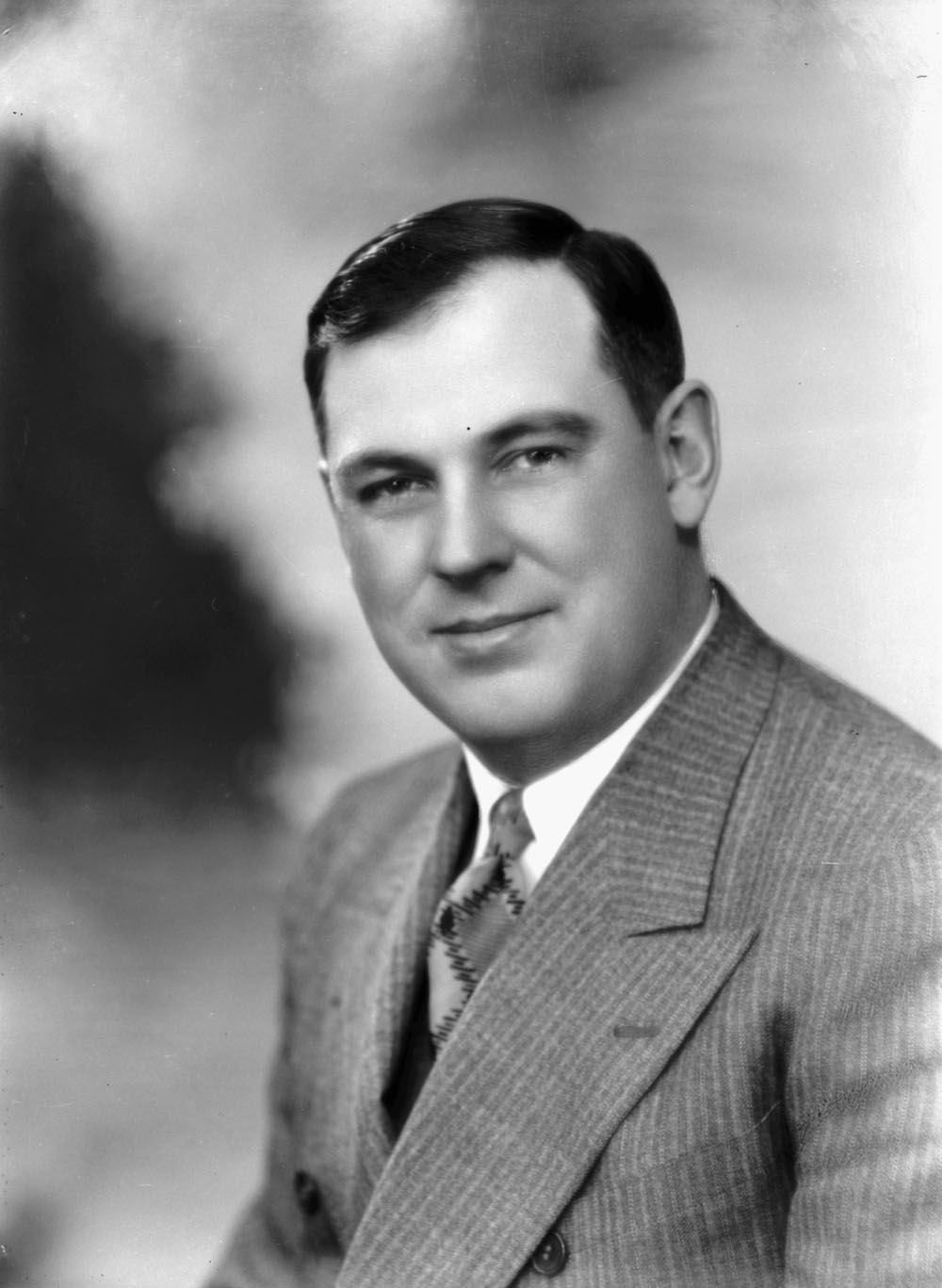
- Campbell in 1937

Member of Parliament for Frontenac—Addington
- In office 24 September 1934 – 11 August 1937
- Preceded by: William Spankie
- Succeeded by: Angus Neil McCallum

MPP for Sault Ste. Marie
- In office 23 November 1937 – 30 June 1943
- Preceded by: Richard McMeekin
- Succeeded by: George Isaac Harvey

Personal details
- Born: 17 January 1901 Shedden, Elgin County, Ontario
- Died: 25 December 1978 (aged 77) Toronto
- Party: Liberal
- Spouse(s): Vera Smith m. 25 May 1923
- Profession: mining engineer

Colin Alexander "Collie" Campbell DSO OBE (17 January 1901 – 25 December 1978) was a Canadian mining engineer, politician and curling administrator. Campbell was the president of the International Curling Federation from 1968 to 1978 and served as a Liberal Party member of the House of Commons of Canada. He was born in Shedden, Ontario.

== Biography ==
Campbell attended school at Lawrence Station and high school in Dutton before further studies at Queen's University. His father was active in local politics for more than three decades.

Campbell was elected to Parliament at the Frontenac—Addington riding in a by-election on 24 September 1934 and re-elected in the 1935 federal election.

Campbell resigned on 11 August 1937 before the end of the 18th Canadian Parliament to enter provincial politics at the 1937 Ontario election. He was defeated on election day in the provincial district of Addington, but subsequently contested a by-election in Sault Ste. Marie after newly elected member Richard McMeekin resigned. He served as Minister of Public Works under premier Mitchell Hepburn, but left provincial politics at the 1943 Ontario election. He returned to stand in the 1947 Ontario Liberal leadership convention but lost to Farquhar Oliver.

Campbell served with the Royal Canadian Engineers during World War II and was awarded the Order of the British Empire in 1943 and the Distinguished Service Order in 1945.

Following his time in office, Campbell served as president of the Northern Ontario Curling Association, and then president of the Canadian Curling Association from 1947 to 1948 and the International Curling Federation (now the World Curling Federation) from 1968 until his death in 1978. He was inducted into the Canadian Curling Hall of Fame in 1973, and the WCF Hall of Fame in 1990. The Collie Campbell Memorial Award for sportsmanship at the World Men's Curling Championship is named in his honour. On the ice, he played lead for Ontario at the 1951 Macdonald Brier, Canada's national men's curling championship.

== Personal life ==
Campbell was married to Vera Smith and had five children. He died at the Toronto General Hospital.

== See also ==
- Canadian pipe mine
