= Arthur Wishart =

Canadian politician (1903–1986)

Member of the Ontario Parliament for Sault Ste. Marie
- In office 1963–1971
- Preceded by: Harry Lyons
- Succeeded by: John Rhodes

Personal details
- Born: June 11, 1903 Chipman, New Brunswick
- Died: November 23, 1986 (aged 83) Sault Ste. Marie, Ontario
- Party: Progressive Conservative
- Occupation: Lawyer

Arthur Allison Wishart, CM (June 11, 1903 – November 23, 1986) was a politician and in the Legislative Assembly of Ontario from 1963 to 1971. He was a Progressive Conservative member who served in the cabinets of John Robarts and Bill Davis.

== Background ==
Born in New Brunswick, Wishart obtained his law degree from Osgoode Hall Law School in 1930, and then practised in Windsor and Blind River.

== Politics ==
He served as mayor of Blind River before moving to Sault Ste. Marie.

In the 1963 provincial election, he was elected the Progressive Conservative Party of Ontario Member of Provincial Parliament (MPP) for Sault Ste. Marie.

He entered the cabinet within a year as Attorney General of Ontario under then Premier John Robarts. He served in that senior cabinet portfolio for seven years, and is credited with shepherding many important pieces of legislation, including the Legal Aid Act of 1966 and the Law Enforcement Compensation Act of 1967.

In 1967, Wishart fired Morton Shulman from his position as Chief Coroner of Metropolitan Toronto as a result of Shulman's criticisms of the government's failure to follow various recommendations made in coroner's inquiries. The dismissal propelled Shulman, until then a long-time Tory, into politics as a candidate and then MPP for the New Democratic Party.

In early 1971, Wishart became Minister of Financial and Consumer Affairs under Robarts's successor, Bill Davis, and served until retiring from politics at the 1971 provincial election.

Wishart was very active on the issue of franchises while he was Minister of Finance and Minister of Consumer and Commercial Affairs. He initiated the Grange Commission, an inquiry held into the financial abuse of franchisees by franchisors. The Arthur Wishart (Franchise Disclosure) Act, passed in 2000 was named in his honour.

=== Cabinet positions ===
Davis ministry, Province of Ontario (1971–1985)
Cabinet post (1)
Predecessor	Office	Successor
Bert Lawrence	Minister of Financial and Commercial Affairs; 1971 (March–December)	Gordon Carton
Robarts ministry, Province of Ontario (1961–1971)
Cabinet post (1)
Predecessor	Office	Successor
Frederick Cass	Attorney General; 1964–1971; Also Minister of Justice 1966–1971	Allan Lawrence

== Later life ==
After leaving politics, he served the province as chairman of the Criminal Injuries Compensation Board and later of the Commission on Election Contributions and Expenses. He returned to Queen's Park in 1973 as a liaison between Premier Davis and the Progressive Conservative caucus.

Wishart was a supporter of Sault Ste. Marie's local university, Algoma University, and in 1989 a new wing was built at Algoma to house the Arthur A. Wishart Library.

In 1976, he was made a Member of the Order of Canada. He died on November 23, 1986.
