= Francis Edward Crawford =

Canadian politician and public servant (1870–1947)

Francis E. Crawford
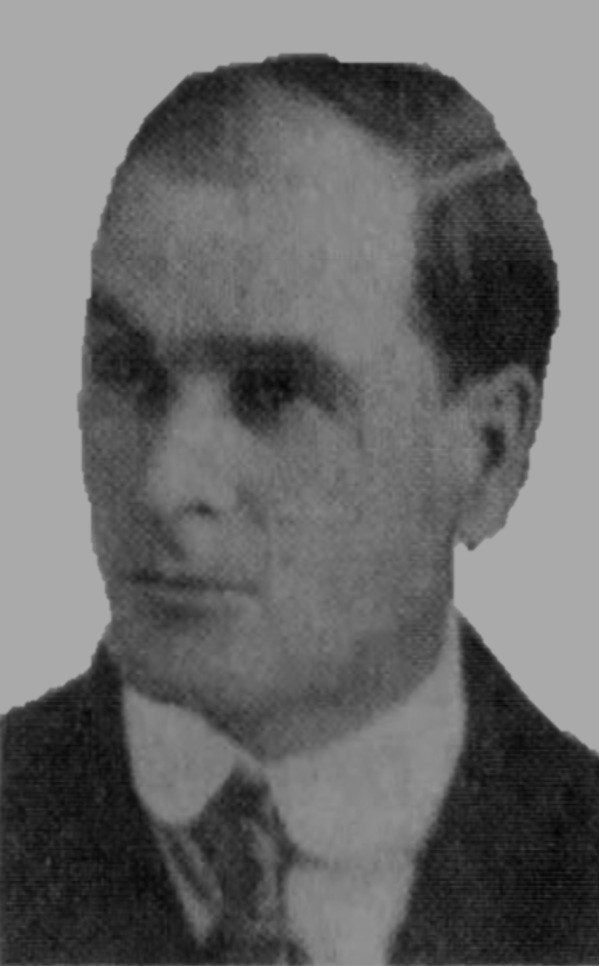

4th Mayor of the City of Sault Ste. Marie, Ontario
- In office January 1917 – August 15, 1918
- Preceded by: John Alexander McPhail
- Succeeded by: Thomas Dean

Personal details
- Born: Francis Edward Crawford; 12 October 1870 Sunnidale, Simcoe County, Ontario, Canada
- Died: 16 March 1947 (aged 76) Sault Ste. Marie, Ontario
- Spouse: Sophia Jane Parks (1890-1906) (m. 1890) Elizabeth Taylor McKague (1910-1926) (m. 1910) Mary Oliver (1927-1947) (m. 1927)
- Children: 8

Francis Edward Crawford (October 12, 1870—March 16, 1947) was a Canadian politician and municipal public servant who served as the fourth mayor of the city of Sault Ste. Marie. He was elected four times to the town and city councils and was twice elected mayor. In 1918 was appointed the city's assessment commissioner, a role he held for 29 years.

== Early life ==
Francis Crawford was born October 12, 1870, in Sunnidale, Ontario, the second son of Eliza Crow and carpenter Andrew Crawford.

He attended elementary school in Sunnidale, and high school in Collingwood. For a time, he was a school teacher in Parry Sound and Mattawa, Ontario.

In 1902 he moved to Sault Ste. Marie and opened a real estate and insurance business selling new lots for development and farming as well as dwellings in the community.

== Municipal politics and public service ==
Due to his real estate work and familiarity with land and property values, in February 1906 the town council hired Crawford as one of two assessors to conduct that year's property value assessment. He was hired to perform this work again in 1910 and 1916.

In the 1912 election, Crawford was elected to a seat on the town council. When the provincial act to incorporate the City of Sault Ste. Marie was enacted on April 16, 1912, Crawford and other members of that year's town council become the first council of the new city. In the January 1913 election, he once again put his name forward and was elected to the city council coming third in a group of 19 candidates for eight city-wide seats. He was re-elected in 1914 and 1915 but declined to run again in 1916.

=== 1914 provincial election ===
In the run-up to the 1914 provincial election, Crawford was persuaded by local partisans to accept the nomination of the Liberal Party to challenge sitting Conservative cabinet minister William Howard Hearst who was seeking a third term. Consistent with the party's platform, Crawford campaigned on “more advanced temperance legislation.” Given his personal experience, he also advocated for changes to the assessment regime to assess lands at full value, but reduce the assessment value of improvements made by owners. As was the case elsewhere in the province, the temperance issue failed to move Sault voters and Crawford lost to Hearst by 800 votes.

=== Mayor ===
In December 1916, Crawford was nominated to run for mayor in the January 1, 1917 municipal election. Crawford campaigned sparingly only running ads and an open letter in The Sault Daily Star in which he emphasized his service on council's water and light committee as being useful experience with the city considering a major water project that year. He concluded the letter, “I do not intend to call and ask you for your votes. I have never yet asked a man to vote for me and do not intend to do it now.” He and was elected by a 204-vote margin over his opponent.

With no other candidates nominated to challenge him in the January 1918 municipal election, Crawford was declared mayor by acclamation on December 31, 2017. He was mayor of a much larger city than previously. As decided by an earlier referendums, the 7,000 residents of Steelton were absorbed by the city of Sault Ste. Marie on January 1, 1918 bringing the city's total population to about 21,000.

Crawford became the first mayor in the city's history to resign from office. He tendered his resignation on August 15, 1918, when the city appointed him assessment commissioner.

=== City Assessor ===
As the city's first permanent assessment commissioner, Crawford was paid an annual stipend of $2,400. Upon taking this appointment, he wound up his real estate and insurance business.

Not long into his duties, Crawford was the centre of a minor controversy when some of his former colleagues on council questioned how he was spending his time in the role. In December 1918 he appeared before council to give an accounting of his work, explaining that an office had yet to be set up for him at city hall and that much of his work involved being away from the office conducting assessments. At the conclusion of this, the council adopted a motion expressing its confidence in the job he was doing.

Crawford remained in this role until his death.

== Personal life ==
On May 25, 1890, at age 19, Crawford married Sophia Jane Parks in Barrie, Ontario. The couple had eight children. Sophia died of pneumonia in Sault Ste. Marie on June 15, 1906, at age 46.

He married his second wife, Elizabeth Taylor McKague on April 2, 1910 in Blind River, Ontario. She died suddenly 16 years later on April 22, 1926 in Sault Ste. Marie at age 64.

On February 19, 1927, at age 56, he married his third wife, Mary Oliver at St. Andrews United Church in Sault Ste. Marie.

Crawford was an avid horticulturalist, often winning awards for his flowers in local fairs and floral shows.

== Death and tributes ==
Nine days after suffering a stroke, Crawford died at his Knox Avenue home on March 16, 1947 at age 76. A service was held three days later at Langstaff Funeral Home. His remains were interred at Greenwood Cemetery.

Mayor William Brien praised his public service before council saying, “Mr Crawford served the municipality faithfully and honestly and was held in high regard by all … He was well-known and well liked and had a reputation throughout his whole life as a fair and honest man.”

The council passed a resolution expressing sympathy to his family and saying “His death is a severe loss to the community which he so faithfully served.”
