= Carmen Provenzano =

Canadian politician (1942–2005)

MP for Sault Ste. Marie
- In office June 2, 1997 – June 28, 2004
- Preceded by: Ron Irwin
- Succeeded by: Tony Martin

Personal details
- Born: February 3, 1942
- Died: July 27, 2005 (aged 63)
- Party: Liberal
- Occupation: lawyer

Carmen Provenzano (February 3, 1942 – July 27, 2005) was a Canadian politician. He represented the Sault Ste. Marie electoral district in the House of Commons of Canada from 1997 to 2004. He was a member of the Liberal Party of Canada.

Carmen Provenzano was a graduate of St. Mary's College in the Sault. He received a Bachelor of Arts degree from the University of Windsor, and a law degree (LLB) from Queen's University in Kingston.

On graduation, he started his legal career in the city of Sault Ste. Marie's legal department, and for 25 years was self-employed in legal private practice in the Sault, specializing in municipal and planning law.

He served as a charter member of the Algoma District Health Council, and for 13 consecutive years as a trustee on the Sault Ste. Marie Board of Education, where he served on all committees, including finance (chair) and salary negotiation.

Provenzano was the past chair of the Northern Ontario Liberal caucus. After his election to Parliament in 1997 and re-election in 2000, he served as parliamentary secretary to the Minister of Veterans Affairs, and was on several standing committees of the House of Commons, including fisheries and oceans (vice-chair), government operations and natural resources (vice-chair), and national defence and veterans affairs.

He was also a member of the parliamentary steel caucus. As the Sault's MP, he considered his involvement in the successful restructuring of Algoma Steel a significant personal achievement.

He was married to his wife Ada for nearly 40 years, and together they had four children.

Provenzano died from a sudden heart attack on July 27, 2005. His nephew Christian Provenzano ran unsuccessfully for the Liberals in his former riding during the 2006 federal election and the 2011 federal election, and was elected mayor of Sault Ste. Marie in the 2014 municipal election.

== Legacy ==
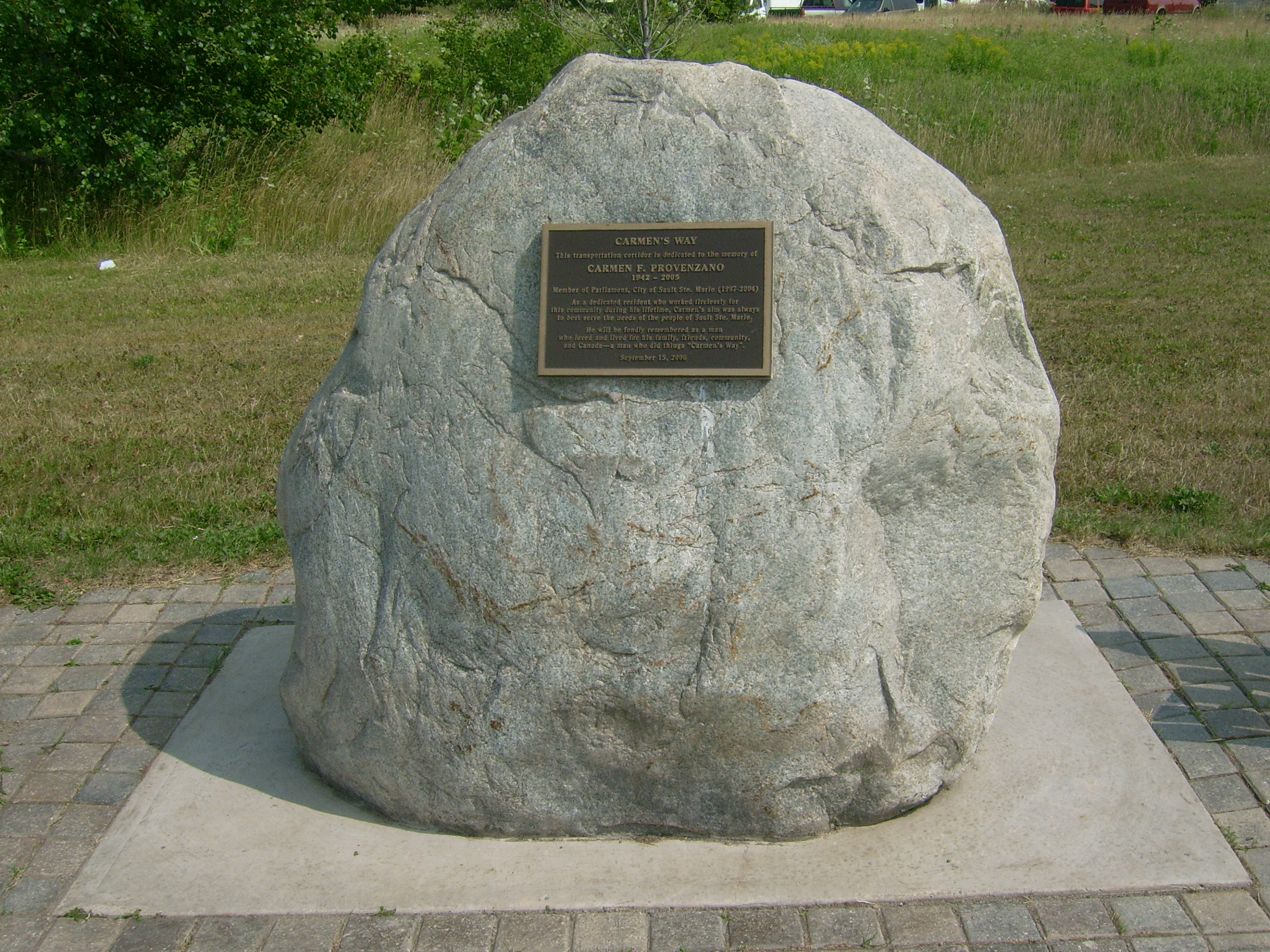
Dedication plaque for Carmen's Way mounted on a boulder along the HUB Trail in Sault Ste. Marie.

On September 15, 2006, "Carmen's Way", a bypass for truck traffic between the Sault Ste. Marie International Bridge and Highway 17, was formally dedicated in Sault Ste. Marie in Provenzano's memory. A dedication plaque reads in part: He will be fondly remembered as a man who loved and lived for his family, friends, community, and Canada--a man who did things "Carmen's Way."
