= Celia Ross =

- Education: Queen's University; University of Bordeaux
- Scientific career
- Workplaces: Algoma University

Celia Ross is the former president of Algoma University in Sault Ste. Marie, Ontario. She was also a candidate for the Ontario New Democratic Party in the 2011 provincial election and in the 2014 provincial election Originally from Guelph, Ontario, Ross received her bachelor's degree from Queen's University, and went on to earn her master's and doctoral degrees in French literature from the Université de Bordeaux III. Ross taught in Algoma's modern languages program beginning in 1982. She became academic dean in 1997, and was president from 1998 to 2010. Algoma University's Board of Governors appointed Ross Acting President on December 2, 2016 upon the resignation of President Craig Chamberlin.

During her time as Algoma's president, the college ended its affiliation with Laurentian University, and increased its enrolment substantially. She presided during the 1990s discussions regarding the pressure to rename the institution Shingwauk University and refocus on aboriginal education as the primary mission.

== See also ==
- List of Canadian university leaders
