= William Howard Hearst =

Canadian politician, premier of Ontario

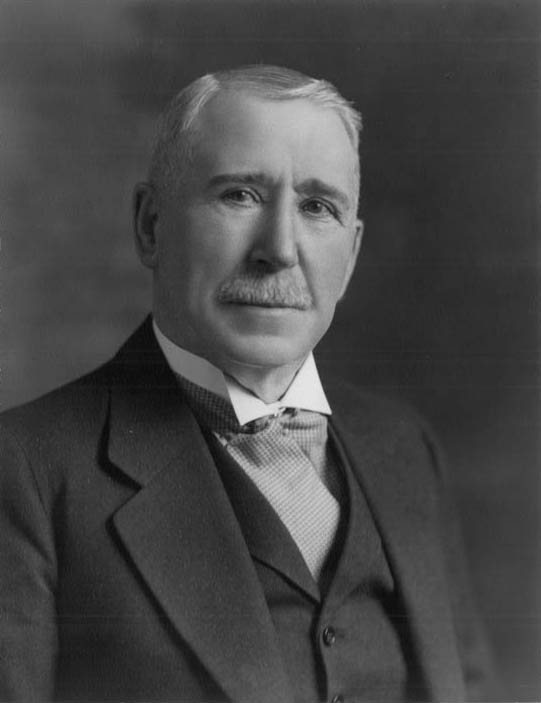
- The Hon. Sir William Hearst

7th Premier of Ontario
- In office October 2, 1914 – November 14, 1919
- Monarch: George V
- Lieutenant Governor: John Strathearn Hendrie
- Preceded by: James Whitney
- Succeeded by: Ernest Charles Drury

MPP for Sault Ste. Marie
- In office June 8, 1908 – September 23, 1919
- Preceded by: Charles Napier Smith
- Succeeded by: James Cunningham

Personal details
- Born: February 15, 1864 Arran Township, Canada West
- Died: September 29, 1941 (aged 77) Toronto, Ontario, Canada
- Resting place: Mount Pleasant Cemetery, Toronto
- Party: Ontario PC Party
- Spouse: Isabella Jane Duncan

Sir William Howard Hearst, KCMG (February 15, 1864 – September 29, 1941) was the seventh premier of Ontario from 1914 to 1919.

Hearst was born in Bruce County, Canada West. He practiced law in Sault Ste. Marie, Ontario before being voted to provincial parliament as a member of the Progressive Conservative Party of Ontario. After six years representing Sault Ste. Marie in provincial government, Hearst became Premier of Ontario following the death of Premier James P. Whitney in 1914.

Hearst was the first Conservative provincial government to enact women's suffrage. He was in favour of the prohibition movement and restricted the unlicensed sale of alcohol in Ontario. As a wartime administration, his government improved munitions production and hydroelectric infrastructure.

== Early life and career ==
William Howard Hearst was born in the Township of Arran in Bruce County, Ontario. He studied law in Owen Sound and was called to the bar lawyer in 1888. Hearst moved to Sault Ste. Marie, Ontario, where he established the law firm Masson, Hearst, McKay in the Ganley Block at 604 Queen Street. Hearst participated actively in the Sault Ste. Marie community and was on the building committee to erect a new Methodist church at the corner of Spring Street and Albert Street in Sault Ste. Marie. The Methodist church that was eventually built still stands and is now known as Central United Church.

Hearst was an unsuccessful candidate in the Algoma East riding in 1894. In 1902, he organized support in Northern Ontario for James P. Whitney. Hearst was also appointed Sault Ste. Marie's volunteer fire chief from 1891 to 1892. Hearst built a house at the corner of Queen Street and Upton Road. Known as Eastbourne, it would become a designated heritage property in the City of Sault Ste. Marie.

In 1908, Hearst was elected member for the riding of Sault Ste. Marie. He became Minister of Lands, Forests and Mines in 1911. On the death of Whitney in 1914, Hearst became his successor and was sworn in as Premier on October 2, 1914, the first premier from Northern Ontario.

== Premiership ==
Under his administration, a comprehensive measure to provide compensation to workers for injuries was put into operation. He took steps to deal with housing problems and provide loans to settlers. Municipal acts were passed. School fairs and the teaching of agriculture were inaugurated. Measures were taken to increase war production. Reforestation and fire prevention services were established. The Orpington Hospital, in England, was built as a gift from the people of Ontario.

An increase in demand for electricity in Ontario led Hearst's government to commission the construction of the Queenston-Chippawa Hydroelectric Generating Station in 1917, which was one of the largest hydroelectric projects in the world.

During the 1917 conscription crisis, Hearst supported conscription and the federal Unionist government. In March 1918, Hearst and the Ontario Liberal leader, William Proudfoot, agreed to extend the existing provincial government until Canadian forces returned home in 1919.

=== Prohibition ===
The Hearst government struggled to find consensus on the question of prohibition. Hearst personally identified with the temperance movement, but barkeepers and alcohol producers formed part of the voter base of his party. Hearst established the Board of License Commissioners (BLC) in 1915, which distributed licenses for businesses seeking to sell alcohol.

In 1916, the Ontario Temperance Act (OTA) was introduced as a temporary wartime measure by Hearst, a temperance advocate and pillar of the Methodist Church. It made possession of liquor and beer outside one's home illegal. Although one could retain a cellar supply for personal consumption, it was illegal to sell a drink. As a result, the government shut down bars, taverns, clubs, and liquor stores. The establishment of the Acts were controversial among anti-temperance Canadians.

In 1919, after Canadian soldiers had returned from Europe, Hearst called a plebiscite on prohibition, which was held the same day as the 1919 general election. Prohibition was approved by the voters, but his government was defeated in the election.

=== Women's suffrage ===
Beginning in 1915, Liberal representatives proposed bills enabling women to vote in Ontario. Hearst initially opposed suffrage but by 1917 had changed his opinion on the subject. Ontario was the fifth province to pass legislation permitting women to vote, and Hearst's government was the first Conservative provincial government to do so.

=== 1919 general election ===
In the election of 1919, Hearst was surprised by his loss to the United Farmers of Ontario. Historians have varying opinions on the reason for the result of the election, including federal conscription, the OTA, and poor opinions of the industrial workers and the rural population.

== Later life ==
After his loss in 1919, Hearst remained in Toronto, where he had lived since 1912.

Hearst served as a member of the International Joint Commission, which had been formed to settle international boundary waters disputes between the United States and Canada.

== Legacy ==
The Town of Hearst, in Northern Ontario, is named for William Hearst.

A street in North York, south of the intersection of Keele Street and Wilson Avenue, is named after him. The Hennick Humber Hospital and offices of the Ministry of Transportation are on this street.

A plaque honouring Sir William H. Hearst stands in Tara Park in the Municipality of Arran–Elderslie in Bruce County. It was erected by the Ontario Archeological and Historic Sites Board.

=== Sault Ste. Marie ===
William Howard Hearst was the first premier from northern Ontario. He has an enduring legacy in Sault Ste. Marie. A street in the northern city has been named after him. A city streets directory from 1914 shows the street was previously called "Hurst Street", but by 1915, the year after Hearst became Premier of Ontario, the name was changed to "Hearst Street".

In July 2015, the city recognized Hearst by naming the holiday on the first Monday in August (previously known as Civic Holiday) as Sir William H. Hearst Day.

Non-profit organization positions
| Preceded by C. H. Mitchell | President of the Empire Club of Canada; 1922 | Succeeded by Elias H. Wilkinson |
