= John Alexander McPhail =

Canadian industrialist and politician (1878–1956)

John A. McPhail
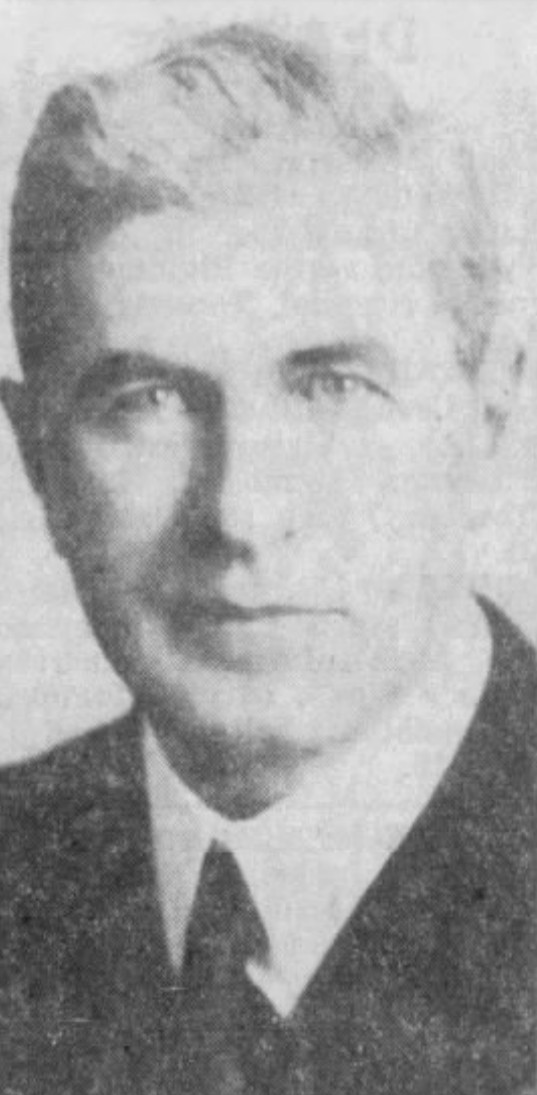

3rd Mayor of the City of Sault Ste. Marie, Ontario
- In office January 1915 – January 1917
- Preceded by: Thomas Edward Simpson
- Succeeded by: Francis Edward Crawford

Personal details
- Born: John Alexander McPhail; 7 February 1878 near Bruce Mines, Ontario, Canada
- Died: 26 March 1956 (aged 78) Sault Ste. Marie, Ontario
- Spouse: Lorraine Alexandria Bole
- Children: 4 (John, Mary, Doris and Sally)

John Alexander McPhail (February 7, 1878—March 26, 1956) was a Canadian industrialist and politician who served as the third mayor of the city of Sault Ste. Marie. He was the founder and president of Great Lakes Power Company and later served as chairman of Algoma Steel Corporation.

== Early life ==
McPhail was born to Margaret Ellen Annis and Daniel P. McPhail near Bruce Mines, Ontario on February 7, 1878. His father was a farmer and later a builder and part owner of McPhail and Wright Construction. He attended school in the Algoma communities of Cloudslee and Mamainse, as well as Kincardine in Bruce Township. After graduating from Osgoode Hall Law School and being called to the bar in September 1900, he practised law in Sault Ste. Marie.

== Municipal politics ==
McPhail took an interest in local politics. He was a town councillor when Sault Ste. Marie was incorporated as a city in April 1912. He was then elected mayor for two annual terms in 1914 and 1915. He later served on city council as an alderman for four years after that.

At the time of his death, he was the last surviving member of the original 1912 city council.

== Great Lakes Power Company ==
By the early 1910s, Algoma Steel Corporation was growing rapidly and with it the demand for increased electricity production for its operations and that of a growing city. In particular, World War I created a huge demand for the plant to produce steel for munitions.

When city plans to establish a publicly owned electricity utility fell through, McPhail and an engineering partner from Chicago founded Great Lakes Power Company in May 1916. Beginning by taking over the relatively small power canal owned by Algoma Steel, the company expanded the canal and added new machinery to generate an increased supply of hydroelectric power. Under his leadership, the company’s electrical output increased 40 times. Initially named vice president under president Samuel Insull of Chicago’s Middle West Utilities Company, McPhail later served as president of the company until May 1952 when he retired after 24 years. At that time, he was named the company’s inaugural chairman of the board and CEO.

McPhail’s expertise and connections to capital were often called upon by other companies and causes on whose boards he served. During the Second World War, he served as chairman of the city’s National War Finance Committee. He was president of the International Transit Corporation that operated ferries on the St. Mary’s River between Ontario and Michigan. In 1955 the company honoured him by christening a ferry in his name.

== Personal life ==
He married Lorraine Alexandria Bole in Sault Ste. Marie on July 11, 1906. The couple had four children, a son, John and three daughters, Mary, Doris and Sally.

== Death and tributes ==
Following an illness of three months, McPhail died at age 78 at Sault Ste. Marie’s General Hospital on the morning of March 26, 1956. His remains were interred at Greenwood Cemetery.

Honorary pallbearers included executives and directors from Montreal, Toronto and Chicago-based companies as well as judges and the city’s mayor.

His obituary in The Sault Daily Star praised his contributions to the city’s industrialization. “He pioneered the development of electric power in this area and was instrumental in bringing millions of dollars of capital into the district.”

He was eulogized as “a humble and modest man of great stature.”
