= Tapleytown, Ontario =

Human settlement in Ontario, Canada

Coordinates: 43.185°N 79.739°W

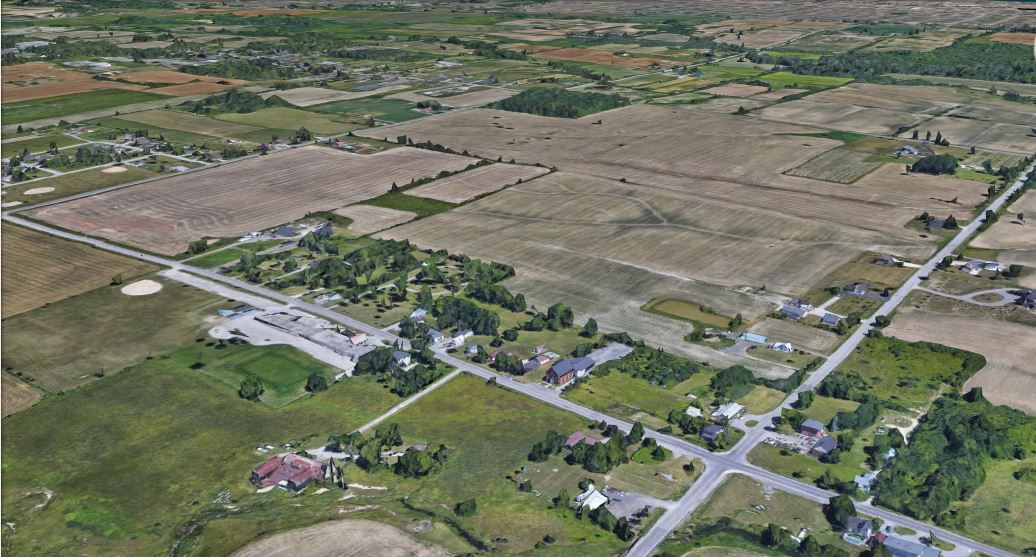
An aerial view of Tapleytown.

Location of Tapleytown in Ontario

Tapleytown is a rural community in the southeastern portion of Hamilton, Ontario.

== Buildings ==
Tapleytown has one school, Tapleytown Elementary School located at 390 Mud St E; this is the second oldest elementary school in the HWDSB, with the one room schoolhouse being built in 1881. Stoney Creek (part of Hamilton since 2001), ON L8J 3C6, Canada. Tapleytown has one church named Tapleytown Church of Christ located at 413 Mud St E, Stoney Creek, ON L8J 3B5, Canada. Tapleytown also has a cemetery, named Tapleytown Cemetery in the same area with the address of 385 Mud St E, Stoney Creek.
