= Demolition belt =

In military terminology, a demolition belt is a selected land area sown with explosive charges, mines, and other available obstacles to deny use of the land to enemy operations, and as a protection to friendly troops.

There are two types of demolition belt:

- A primary demolition belt is a continuous series of obstacles across the whole front, selected by the division or higher commander. The preparation of such a belt is normally a priority engineer task.
- A subsidiary demolition belt is a supplement to the primary belt to give depth in front or behind or to protect the flanks.

== See also ==
- Camouflet
