= Neighbourhoods in Sault Ste. Marie, Ontario =

The city of Sault Ste. Marie, Ontario, Canada contains a significant number of named residential neighbourhoods, including Bayview, Broadview Gardens, Brookfield, Buckley, Carpin Beach, Cedar Heights, East Korah, Eastside, Fort Creek, Grandview Gardens, Korah, Manitou Park, McQueen, Meadow Park, Nokomis Beach, Odena, The P Patch, Pointe aux Pins, Pointe des Chênes, Pointe Louise and Steelton.

== Cambrian Heights ==
Cambrian heights is East of Great Northern Road, West of Pine Street, Below Northern Ave, Above McNabb. The Cambrian Heights origin comes from the original name of The P Patch. Cambrian Heights is mainly a Low/Medium class neighborhood in Central Sault Ste. Marie.

== Bayview ==
The area which is included in Bayview is the square of city blocks made by Wallace Terrace, Goetz Street, Bonney Street, Glasgow Avenue, and the south end of Goulais Avenue.

== Broadview Gardens ==
Broadview Gardens is a residential neighbourhood bounded by Chippewa St. to the north, Second Line W. to the south, Goulais Ave. to the east and Allen's Side Road to the west.

== Cedar Heights ==
Cedar Heights is bounded by Third Line East to the north, Second Line East to the south, Black Rd. to the east and Great Northern Rd to the west. The area contains Bianchi Estates, a middle class subdivision, which continues to expand with new home construction.

== Eastside ==
Eastside is bounded by Trunk Rd. to the north, Chambers Ave. to the south, Boundary Rd. to the west, and Dacey Rd. to the east. The neighbourhood, like other lower eastern neighbourhoods, below the hill, was developed in the 1950s.

Catholic elementary schools in the area include (from west to east) Holy Cross, St. Mary's French Immersion (Formerly, St. Thomas Catholic Elementary School). There are many public elementary schools in the area including Eastview, Grandview, Pinewood, and Parkland. Both Catholic High Schools in the city are located centrally in the city and students are bused from east and west. The Public High School in the east end is White Pines C&VS.

== Fort Creek ==
Fort Creek is an established residential neighbourhood in the north end of the city. Approximate boundaries are Westridge Rd to the north, Second Line East to the south, Sackville Rd. to the east and Fort Creek to the west. The area contains homes built in the 1960s and 1970s as well as modest expansions in the 2000s. The Fort Creek neighbourhood is surrounded by generous greenspace appreciated by local residents.

== Grand ==
Grand area is a collection of streets beginning with "Grand" or starting with the letter G all connected to Grand Boulevard. It is a middle-class neighbourhood bordered by St Georges Avenue East and Northern Avenue East. The streets in this area include Grand, Grandview, Grandriver, Granite, Grandy, Grangemill, Grandhaven and Grandmont. St. Basil's Elementary School is located directly across from the end of Grand Boulevard on St. Georges Avenue East and Northern Heights Elementary School is located on Grand Boulevard.

== Grandview Gardens ==
Grandview Gardens is a residential Neighborhood located on the south side of chambers Ave. The Western/Northern side of Grandview Gardens is fairly a wealthy living location, while the eastern/southern side is more inferior. Grandview is home to 24% of the cities crime. Grandview is home to many parks and schools. Grandview is also located next to the Saint Marys river.

== Meadow ==
Meadow Park is a rather executive area with middle-class homes. Eastern/Southern portion of Meadow Park is rather just a short walk away from one of Sault Ste. Marie's biggest schools. The Western/Northern side of this neighborhood is just a short walk away from shopping malls and other commercial. Meadow Park is home to a well known quiet area.

== The P Patch ==
The approximate boundaries of this neighbourhood are Northern Ave. to the north, McNabb Street to the south, Pine St. to the west and Black Road to the east. The area includes forested greenspace and tobogganing hills.

Once officially named Cambrian Heights, it attained its more representative title as the neighbourhood grew and local residents noticed a peculiar phenomenon - all of the streets began with the letter P. The P Patch's west end contains established homes from the 1960s and 1970s, some of which are rented by students attending the nearby Sault College. The east end is primarily composed of newer single-detached houses.

Street names in the neighbourhood include Princess, Paladin, Pentagon, Plummer, Pleasant, Pageant, Primrose, Panoramic, Plaintree, Partridge, Paradise, Promenade, Peacock, Pinemore, Princeton, Palace, Placid, Parkview, Pelican, Peach, Pine and Pawating (although it is a private lane, bears no street sign and appears only on maps). Today, just one street deviates from the suburban naming rule: Lake Street, which expanded into the neighbourhood from the south.

== Pointe des Chênes ==
Pointe des Chênes (French for "Point of the Oaks" or "Oak Point") is the western portion of Goulais Bay as indicated by the 1755 French map.

== Steelton ==
Steelton was originally its own community developed about 100 years ago for local steel workers and remains a working-class neighbourhood. Its close proximity to Algoma Steel and the downtown core, as well as a desire for suburban living and the ease of modern transportation has prevented its redevelopment.
