= Sault Ste. Marie, Ontario =

Sault Ste. Marie
- City (single-tier)
- City of Sault Ste. Marie
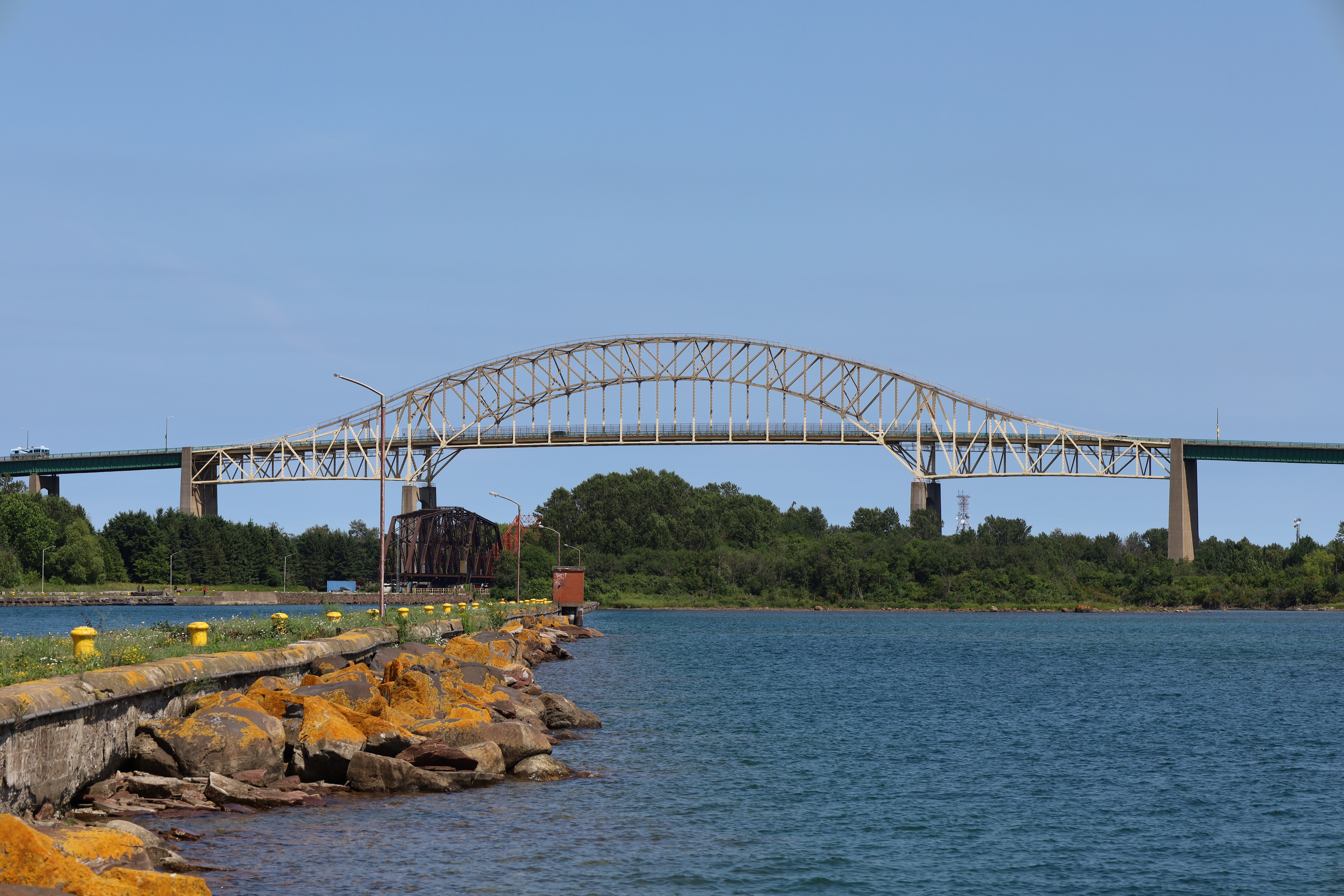
- Sault Ste. Marie International Bridge, connecting Northern Ontario and Upper Michigan.

- Coat of arms
- Nicknames: "The Soo"
- Motto: "Naturally Gifted"
- Location within Ontario
- Coordinates: 46°33′32″N 84°20′49″W
- Country: Canada
- Province: Ontario
- District: Algoma
- Founded: 1668
- Incorporated: July 29, 1871 (village); April 23, 1887 (town); April 16, 1912 (city)

Government
  - Type: Mayor–council
  - Mayor: Matthew Shoemaker
  - Council: Sault Ste. Marie City Council
  - MP: Terry Sheehan (Liberal)
  - MPP: Chris Scott (Independent)

Area
  - Land: 223.24 km^{2} (86.19 sq mi)
  - Urban: 53.05 km^{2} (20.48 sq mi)
  - Metro: 805.60 km^{2} (311.04 sq mi)
- Elevation: 192 m (630 ft)

Population (2021)
  - City (single-tier): 72,051
  - Density: 324.6/km^{2} (841/sq mi)
  - Metro: 76,731
  - Metro density: 95.6/km^{2} (248/sq mi)
- Demonym: Saultite
- Time zone: UTC−05:00 (EST)
  - Summer (DST): UTC−04:00 (EDT)
- Forward sortation area: P6A to P6C
- Area codes: 705, 249, 683
- Website: saultstemarie.ca
- CA rank: 46th in Canada; Municipal rank: 66th in Canada

Sault Ste. Marie (/ˌsuː seɪnt məˈriː/ SOO saynt mə-REE) is a city in Northern Ontario, Canada, on the north shore of the St. Mary's River directly across from its "twin city", Sault Ste. Marie, in the U.S. state of Michigan. The city's population was 72,051 at the 2021 census, making it the third most populous city in Northern Ontario.

The city is a hub for manufacturing (primarily of steel), tourism, and health and social services.

It is the location of the Sault Ste. Marie International Bridge connecting Canada and the United States. The city is bordered to the east by the Rankin and Garden River reserves, and to the west by Prince Township. To the north, the city is bordered by an unincorporated portion of Algoma District, which includes Aweres, Batchawana Bay, Goulais and District, Peace Tree and Searchmont.

The Ojibwe settled here for more than 500 years and call this area Baawitigong, meaning "place of the rapids". In the late 17th century, French Jesuit missionaries established a mission at the Ojibwe settlement. This was followed by development of a fur trading post and larger settlement. By the early 1900s, led by industrialists including Francis Clergue, the community became a regional centre for resource development and manufacturing.

== Etymology ==
The city's name originates from Saults de Sainte-Marie, French for 'Saint Mary's falls', a reference to the rapids of the Saint Marys River.

Etymologically, the word sault comes from an archaic spelling of saut (from sauter), which translates most accurately in this usage to the English word cataract. This in turn derives from the French word for 'leap' or 'jump' (similar to somersault). Citations dating back to 1600 use the sault spelling to mean a cataract, waterfall or rapids. In modern French, the words chutes or rapides are more usual. Sault survives almost exclusively in place names dating from the 17th century, such as Long Sault, Sault St. Louis in Quebec, and Grand-Sault in New Brunswick.

The word sault is pronounced [so] in French, and /suː/ in English.

== History ==
Historical affiliations

Anishinaabe to 1671
Kingdom of France 1671–1763
British Empire 1763–1867
Canada 1867–present

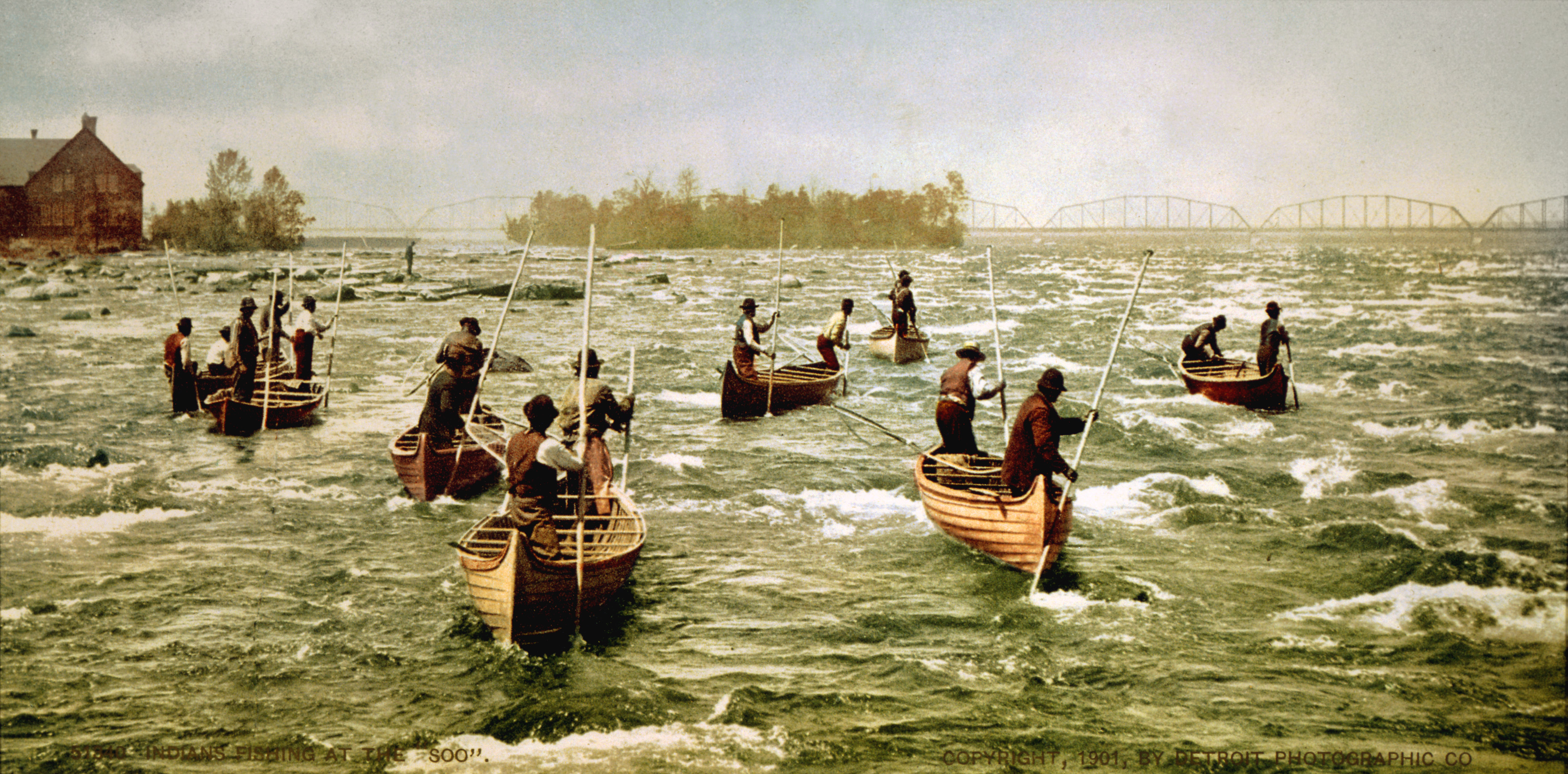
Ojibwe fishermen in the St. Marys Rapids, 1901

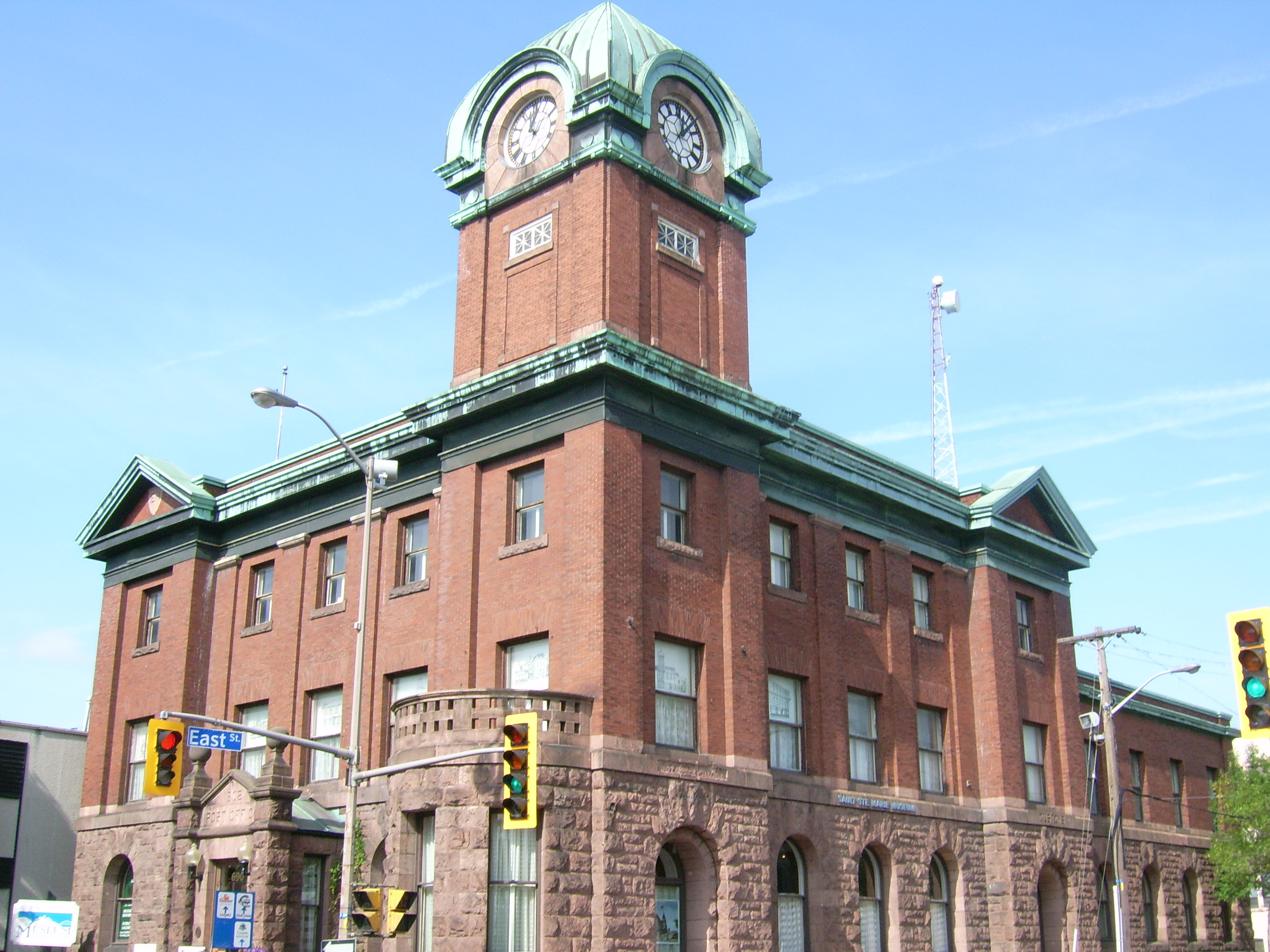
Sault Ste. Marie Museum in downtown Sault Ste. Marie

=== Pre-colonial period ===
Prior to the arrival of Europeans in the 1620s, the area that is now Sault Ste. Marie was shared by the Ojibwe, Odawa and Potawatomi whose Algonkian ancestors had come from the east around 1200.

The rapids created an impediment to travel and an obvious stopping point for voyages west to Lake Superior or east to Lake Huron. In addition, the location offered a strong strategic position to observe movement along the river. The Indigenous people drew on the ample resources of the area including wild game and berries, materials to build shelters, and most importantly sturgeon in the spring and abundant whitefish in the fall.

The Ojibwe called this area Baawitigong, meaning "place of the rapids" and maintained a permanent settlement of about 150 to 200 people. Baawitigong was also an important meeting place for the broader family of Algonquin peoples and would grow to thousands during the whitefish season each year.

=== Arrival of the French ===
The very first European recorded to have seen the rapids was French explorer Étienne Brûlé, whose 1621 voyage to the mouth of Lake Superior took him, together with his Huron guides, along the north channel of Lake Huron. The French named this area of rapids Sault de Gaston in honour of Gaston, Duke of Orléans, the brother of King Louis XIII. This is the name that appears on Samuel de Champlain's 1632 map of New France based on descriptions from Brûlé and others.

In 1668, French Jesuit missionaries renamed the area Sault Sainte-Marie, and established a mission settlement on the river's south bank, making Sault Ste. Marie, Michigan one of the oldest French settlements in North America. Based on his voyages with the Jesuits the year before, explorer Louis Jolliet marked the area "Le Sault St. Marie" on his 1674 map.

=== Exploration and the fur trade ===
Sault Ste. Marie formed a key crossroads of the 5,000 km (3,000 mi) fur trade route, which stretched from the north country above Lake Superior through the St. Marys River and on to Montreal and European markets.

The French used the area as a juncture to search for other riches as well. In 1736, French naval officer Louis Denys de la Ronde established a shipyard on the north shore of the St. Mary's near Pointe-aux-Pins. Inspired by reports of precious metals, from here the first decked vessel was constructed and launched onto Lake Superior to mine its shores for copper. From this same spot, American-born explorer Alexander Henry built a 40 ton sloop and barge to explore the Superior for mineral riches.

At the conclusion of the Seven Years' War in 1763, France relinquished virtually all of its interests in North America and the British and their First Nations allies controlled the fur trade on the Great Lakes. Around 1790 the North West Company established a fur trading post at the village. A cosmopolitan, mixed population of Europeans, First Nations peoples, and Métis grew up around the it on both sides of the river.

Traders regularly interacted with tribes from around the Great Lakes. British fur trader John Johnston, his Ojibwe wife, Ozhaguscodaywayquay (Woman of the Green Glade), daughter of a chief, and their multi-racial children were prominent here in the village in the late 1700s. They frequently hosted travellers from both the US and Canada. The children were taught English, Ojibwe and French.

Their daughter Jane Johnston married Henry Rowe Schoolcraft, a US Indian agent and early ethnographer, and they had children. Jane Johnston Schoolcraft has been recognized as the first Native American poet and writer in the United States.

=== War of 1812 and aftermath ===
This fluid environment changed during and after the War of 1812 between Britain and the United States. Trade dropped during the war and on July 20, 1814, an American force destroyed the North West Company depot on the north shore of the St. Marys River. Since the Americans were unable to capture Fort Mackinac, the British forces retained control of Sault Ste. Marie. As noted, after the war and defining a new border, the US closed its territory to British Canadian traders, shutting off much interaction.

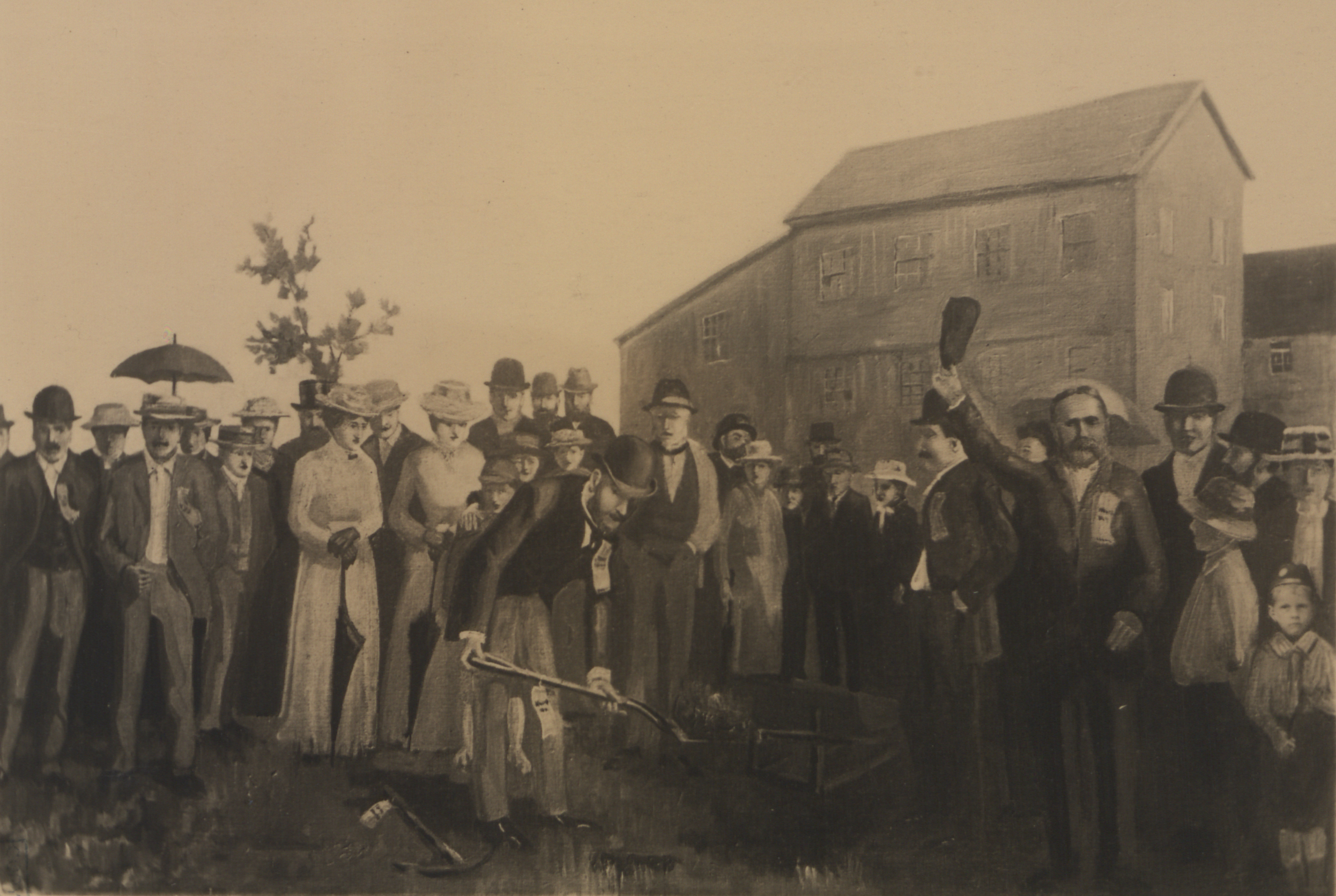
Turning the first sod ceremony for the construction of the Sault Ste. Marie Canal, July 30, 1890

In 1870, the United States refused to give the steamer Chicora, carrying Colonel Garnet Wolseley, permission to pass through the locks at Sault Ste Marie, which were otherwise available to both US and Canadian ships. They had built the first locks in 1855. In order to control their own water passage, the Canadians constructed the Sault Ste. Marie Canal, which was completed in 1895.

=== Canadian Pacific Railway ===
Although Sault Ste. Marie had been a planned destination for railway expansion since the early 1880s, there was considerable disagreement within the business consortium assembled to build the Canadian Pacific Railway as to whether or not to route its transcontinental line through it. The symbolic "first spike" of the railway had been driven at Bonfield, Ontario in Nipissing District in 1881, and construction had been proceeding westward. The American railway magnate James J. Hill, nicknamed the "Empire Builder", supported a route through Sault Ste. Marie, which would allow for both a "water bridge" to the head of Lake Superior at Thunder Bay and an all-rail connection to the west via American railways in the Midwest, benefiting Hill's St Paul, Minneapolis and Manitoba Railroad. Simultaneously, there were political considerations around the railway as a nation-building project coupled with fears of American expansionism. During the Red River Rebellion, the Wolseley expedition had left Toronto in May 1870 and only arrived at Fort Garry, Manitoba by August. American control of the Sault Ste. Marie locks was seen to be a continued potential impediment to future military transportation within Canada. An all-Canadian rail route would bypass this.

A CPR line was surveyed and gradually constructed along the north shore of Lake Huron, cutting through the La Cloche Mountains, while the Central Ontario-based Midland Railway of Canada also surveyed its own line, but became insolvent and collapsed shortly after. The Northern Railway of Canada, which had pushed northward from Toronto to Lake Simcoe, sought to push further to North Bay and then cut west under a subsidiary called the Northern, North-Western, and Sault Ste. Marie Railway, competing directly with the CPR. It also collapsed and ultimately the line terminated at a junction with the CPR line south of North Bay, named Nipissing Junction.

Throughout the abrupt rise and fall of these competing projects, CPR construction had slowly marched westward under engineer James Worthington. By 1884, however, changes had occurred in CPR management with the rise of William Cornelius Van Horne, who would later become the company's president. Both Hill and Worthington resigned from the company, and Hill became a bitter opponent of it. A new transcontinental mainline through Northern Ontario, passing directly through the interior and bypassing the lakeshore settlements along Lake Huron (including Sault Ste. Marie), was laid out and constructed from a point on the line which became known as Sudbury Junction. This junction point became a small CPR town, and with the discovery of vast mineral resources in the Sudbury Basin during the construction of this transcontinental line north of the junction, mining activity in the Sudbury area grew explosively, leading to the creation of Sudbury District in 1894 and shifting economic focus away from Sault Ste. Marie.

The original CPR line (by then known as the CPR Algoma Branch), which had lain dormant until 1888, was finally reactivated and completed through to Sault Ste. Marie, joining with the St Paul, Minneapolis and Manitoba Railroad via the joint Sault Ste. Marie International Railroad Bridge.

Its economy stagnated toward the end of the 19th century with the decline of the fur trade.

With a population of almost 880, Sault Ste. Marie was incorporated as a village on July 29, 1871. It became a township on April 23, 1887.

The town gained brief international notoriety in 1911 in the trial of Angelina Napolitano, the first person in Canada to use the battered woman defence for murder.

=== Becoming a city ===
Twenty-five years after becoming a town, the provincial government granted Sault Ste. Marie a city charter. The Act to incorporate the City of Sault Ste. Marie left boundaries, by-laws, regulations, contracts, and employees as they had been under the township and allowed the former town council to carry on as the first city council until elections could be held in the new year. It also created a mechanism for the amalgamation of the Moffly subdivision from the neighbouring Steelton township into the city which occurred later that year.

Following a plebiscite of its residents in 1917, Steelton and its 7,000 residents amalgamated with the city on January 1, 1918 bringing the city's population to 18,000.

During World War II, and particularly after the US was attacked by Japan at Pearl Harbor in 1941, government concern turned to protection of the locks and shipping channel at Sault Ste. Marie. A substantial military presence was established to protect the locks from a possible attack by Nazi German aircraft from the north. The recent development of long-range bombers increased fears of a sudden air raid. Military strategists studied polar projection maps, which indicated that the air distance from occupied Norway to the town was about the same as the distance from Norway to New York. That direct route of about 5,000 km (3,000 mi) is over terrain where there were few observers and the long winter nights could hide activity.

A joint Canadian and US committee called the "Permanent Joint Board on Defence" drove the installation of anti-aircraft defence and associated units of the United States Army Air Forces and Royal Canadian Air Force to defend the locks. An anti-aircraft training facility was established 100 km (62 mi) north of Sault Ste. Marie on the shores of Lake Superior. Barrage balloons were installed, and early warning radar bases were established at five locations in northern Ontario (Kapuskasing, Cochrane, Hearst, Armstrong (Thunder Bay District), and Nakina) to watch for incoming aircraft. Military personnel were established to guard sensitive parts of the transportation infrastructure. A little over one year later, in January 1943, most of these facilities and defences were deemed excessive and removed, save a reduced military base at Sault Ste. Marie.

The first Algerine-class minesweeper in the Royal Canadian Navy was named HMCS Sault Ste. Marie (J334) after the city. It was laid down in 1942 and acted as a convoy escort in the Battle of the Atlantic.

On January 29, 1990, under mayor Joe Fratesi, Sault Ste. Marie became a flashpoint in the Meech Lake Accord constitutional debate when council passed a resolution declaring English as the city's official language and the sole language for provision of municipal services. The resolution was widely seen as retaliation for Quebec Premier Robert Bourassa's move to override the Supreme Court of Canada ruling that declared parts of Bill 101 unconstitutional. Bill 101 had declared French as the only official language of Quebec. Numerous other Ontario municipalities had already passed similar protest resolutions, but Sault Ste. Marie was the largest to have passed such a resolution. It was the first to do so despite its sizeable Franco-Ontarian population. Many political figures, including Brian Mulroney, Jean Chrétien and Ontario premier David Peterson, who had strongly condemned Premier Bourassa's use of the 'notwithstanding clause', also expressed their opposition to the Sault Ste. Marie resolution. Peterson and his successor as premier, Bob Rae, refused meetings with Mayor Fratesi on several subsequent occasions, even to discuss unrelated matters.

The city had previously established French as an official language for government services, due to a sizeable French-speaking population, and these residents objected strongly to the council's action. The resolution was struck down by a court ruling in 1994, one year after Premier Bourassa passed Bill 86, which amended that province's language laws in accordance with the Supreme Court ruling.

In 2019, the Government of Canada began an immigration program, called the Rural and Northern Immigration Pilot, which is designed to spread immigration of skilled workers throughout northern communities. North Bay, Sudbury, Timmins, and Thunder Bay are also included in the program, along with other northern communities in other provinces.

== Climate ==
Sault Ste. Marie has a humid continental climate (Köppen climate classification Dfb) with cold, snowy winters and warm humid summers that are moderated to some extent by Lake Superior. Winters are cold and snowy, usually beginning in late November and lasting until early April. Temperatures drop below −20 °C (−4 °F) just over 23 days per year on average. Summers are warm and humid with cool nights. Temperatures above 30 °C (86 °F) occur 4.6 days per year on average. The average annual precipitation is 914.7 mm (36.01 in), which is fairly evenly distributed throughout the year; the autumn months of September to November are the wettest months. The record low was −41.1 °C (−42.0 °F), reported on January 26, 1927, while the highest temperature ever recorded in Sault Ste. Marie was 37.2 °C (99.0 °F) on July 3, 1921.

Climate data for Sault Ste. Marie (Sault Ste. Marie Airport), WMO ID: 71260; coordinates 46°29′06″N 84°30′35″W; elevation: 192 m (630 ft); 1991–2020 normals, extremes 1889–present (Note: Data from Sault Ste. Marie Forestry (1889-1933), Sault Ste. Marie (1949-1959), and at Sault Ste Marie Airport since 1961.)
Month	Jan	Feb	Mar	Apr	May	Jun	Jul	Aug	Sep	Oct	Nov	Dec	Year
Record high humidex	7.8	8.7	27.0	31.6	38.6	41.4	42.9	42.7	39.5	34.4	26.1	19.2	42.9
Record high °C (°F)	8.6 (47.5)	10.8 (51.4)	26.7 (80.1)	27.8 (82.0)	32.3 (90.1)	33.3 (91.9)	37.2 (99.0)	36.1 (97.0)	35.0 (95.0)	26.7 (80.1)	23.0 (73.4)	15.4 (59.7)	37.2 (99.0)
Mean maximum °C (°F)	3.8 (38.8)	5.1 (41.2)	11.0 (51.8)	19.4 (66.9)	27.6 (81.7)	29.9 (85.8)	30.7 (87.3)	30.1 (86.2)	27.6 (81.7)	22.0 (71.6)	13.5 (56.3)	6.8 (44.2)	31.6 (88.9)
Mean daily maximum °C (°F)	−5.0 (23.0)	−4.0 (24.8)	1.4 (34.5)	8.7 (47.7)	16.2 (61.2)	21.8 (71.2)	24.2 (75.6)	23.7 (74.7)	19.4 (66.9)	11.7 (53.1)	4.8 (40.6)	−1.0 (30.2)	10.2 (50.4)
Daily mean °C (°F)	−9.8 (14.4)	−9.4 (15.1)	−4.1 (24.6)	3.4 (38.1)	9.9 (49.8)	15.2 (59.4)	17.9 (64.2)	17.7 (63.9)	13.7 (56.7)	7.2 (45.0)	1.2 (34.2)	−4.8 (23.4)	4.8 (40.6)
Mean daily minimum °C (°F)	−14.5 (5.9)	−14.7 (5.5)	−9.6 (14.7)	−2.0 (28.4)	3.5 (38.3)	8.5 (47.3)	11.6 (52.9)	11.5 (52.7)	8.0 (46.4)	2.7 (36.9)	−2.5 (27.5)	−8.6 (16.5)	−0.5 (31.1)
Mean minimum °C (°F)	−28.4 (−19.1)	−27.2 (−17.0)	−24.4 (−11.9)	−10.8 (12.6)	−3.3 (26.1)	1.1 (34.0)	5.2 (41.4)	5.1 (41.2)	0.2 (32.4)	−4.7 (23.5)	−13.0 (8.6)	−22.0 (−7.6)	−30.7 (−23.3)
Record low °C (°F)	−41.1 (−42.0)	−38.7 (−37.7)	−35.6 (−32.1)	−21.5 (−6.7)	−8.9 (16.0)	−5.6 (21.9)	0.0 (32.0)	−3.3 (26.1)	−8.3 (17.1)	−10.0 (14.0)	−23.4 (−10.1)	−36.7 (−34.1)	−41.1 (−42.0)
Record low wind chill	−44.8	−43.9	−40.5	−27.8	−10.0	−4.3	0.0	0.0	−6.0	−13.9	−29.2	−42.8	−44.8
Average precipitation mm (inches)	65.1 (2.56)	45.6 (1.80)	52.3 (2.06)	71.0 (2.80)	68.6 (2.70)	79.3 (3.12)	76.9 (3.03)	77.9 (3.07)	108.6 (4.28)	110.5 (4.35)	89.0 (3.50)	69.9 (2.75)	914.7 (36.01)
Average rainfall mm (inches)	8.6 (0.34)	5.9 (0.23)	21.8 (0.86)	55.2 (2.17)	67.7 (2.67)	79.3 (3.12)	76.9 (3.03)	77.9 (3.07)	108.5 (4.27)	105.7 (4.16)	53.7 (2.11)	17.0 (0.67)	678.2 (26.70)
Average snowfall cm (inches)	83.7 (33.0)	58.7 (23.1)	38.7 (15.2)	17.3 (6.8)	0.9 (0.4)	0.0 (0.0)	0.0 (0.0)	0.0 (0.0)	0.1 (0.0)	4.8 (1.9)	43.6 (17.2)	77.2 (30.4)	324.9 (127.9)
Average precipitation days (≥ 0.2 mm)	20.2	15.3	13.8	11.7	12.1	11.6	12.7	10.7	14.9	17.6	17.6	19.0	177.2
Average rainy days (≥ 0.2 mm)	3.2	2.1	5.4	9.1	11.8	11.6	12.7	10.7	14.9	16.5	10.0	4.6	112.7
Average snowy days (≥ 0.2 cm)	19.4	14.9	10.6	4.6	0.52	0.0	0.0	0.0	0.16	2.2	11.5	16.8	80.6
Average relative humidity (%) (at 1500 LST)	73.9	69.9	63.6	56.6	54.6	58.9	60.8	61.7	64.2	68.2	73.6	76.9	65.3
Average dew point °C (°F)	−12.2 (10.0)	−11.9 (10.6)	−8.0 (17.6)	−2.5 (27.5)	4.2 (39.6)	10.3 (50.5)	13.7 (56.7)	13.8 (56.8)	10.6 (51.1)	4.1 (39.4)	−1.9 (28.6)	−7.4 (18.7)	1.1 (34.0)
Mean monthly sunshine hours	72.8	109.9	150.3	182.2	240.2	265.8	266.3	240.9	154.7	119.1	61.8	55.8	1,919.7
Percentage possible sunshine	26.0	37.9	40.8	44.8	51.7	56.3	55.7	54.8	40.9	35.1	21.8	20.8	40.6
Source 1: Environment and Climate Change Canada (January / July maximum) (sun 1981–2010) (September maximum)
Source 2: weatherstats.ca (for dewpoint and monthly & yearly average)

== Economy ==
The city developed considerable industry before and after World War II, especially in steel-making. Algoma (formerly Algoma Steel; Essar Steel Algoma) is the largest single employer, with 3,500 employees at the main plant and approximately 553 (of which 440 were classed as unionised) at an adjacent tube mill operated by Tenaris. During the 1940s, the steel and chromium operations were of substantial importance to the war effort in Canada and the United States. Algoma Steel and the Chromium Mining and Smelting Corporation were key producers for transportation and military machines.

The Huron Central Railway has been important into the 21st century to the steel operation, despite extensive railway restructuring elsewhere. Genesee & Wyoming, owner of the railway, announced its intention to discontinue operations. It continued to operate under an agreement which terminated on August 15, 2010.

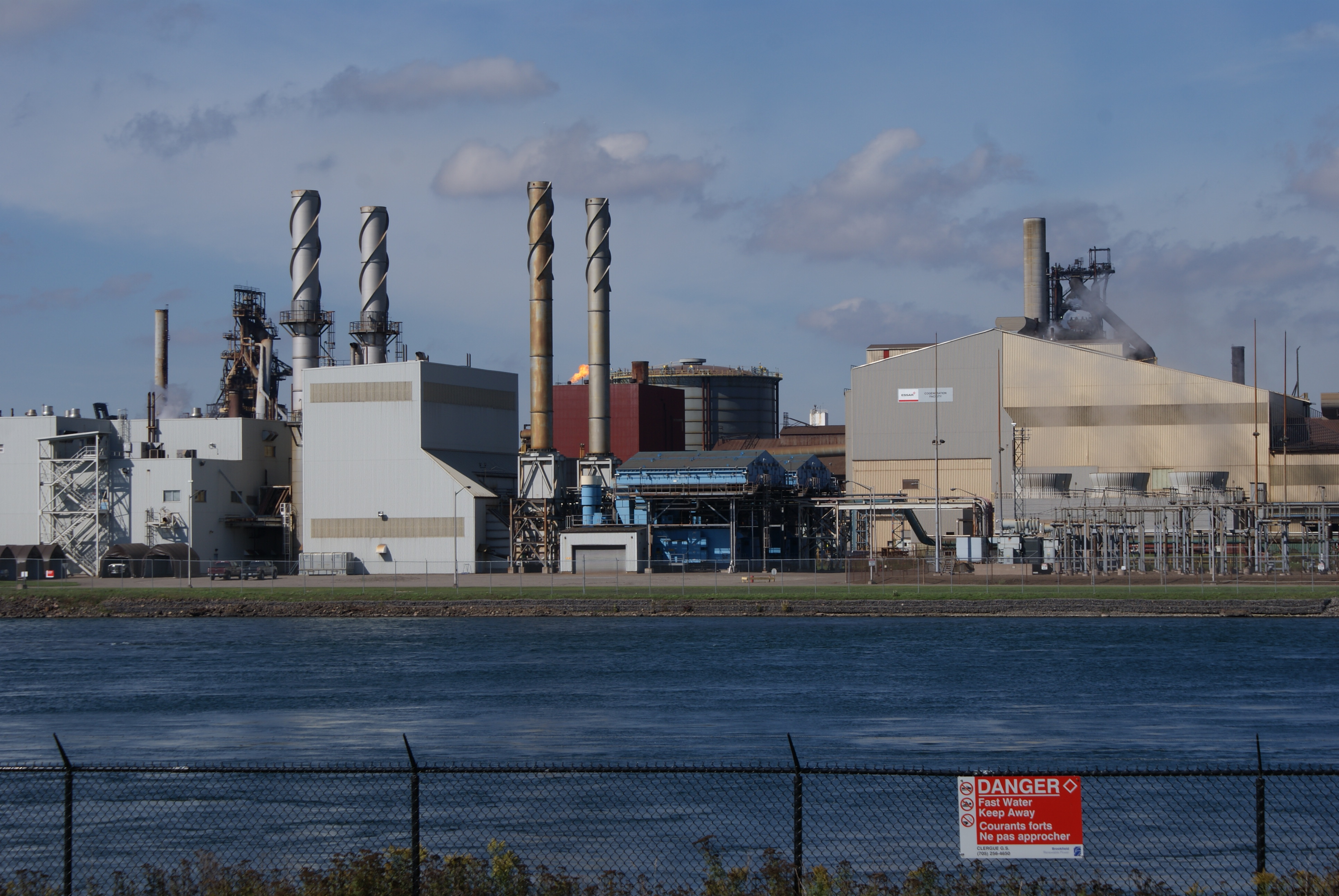
ESSAR Steel Algoma Inc.

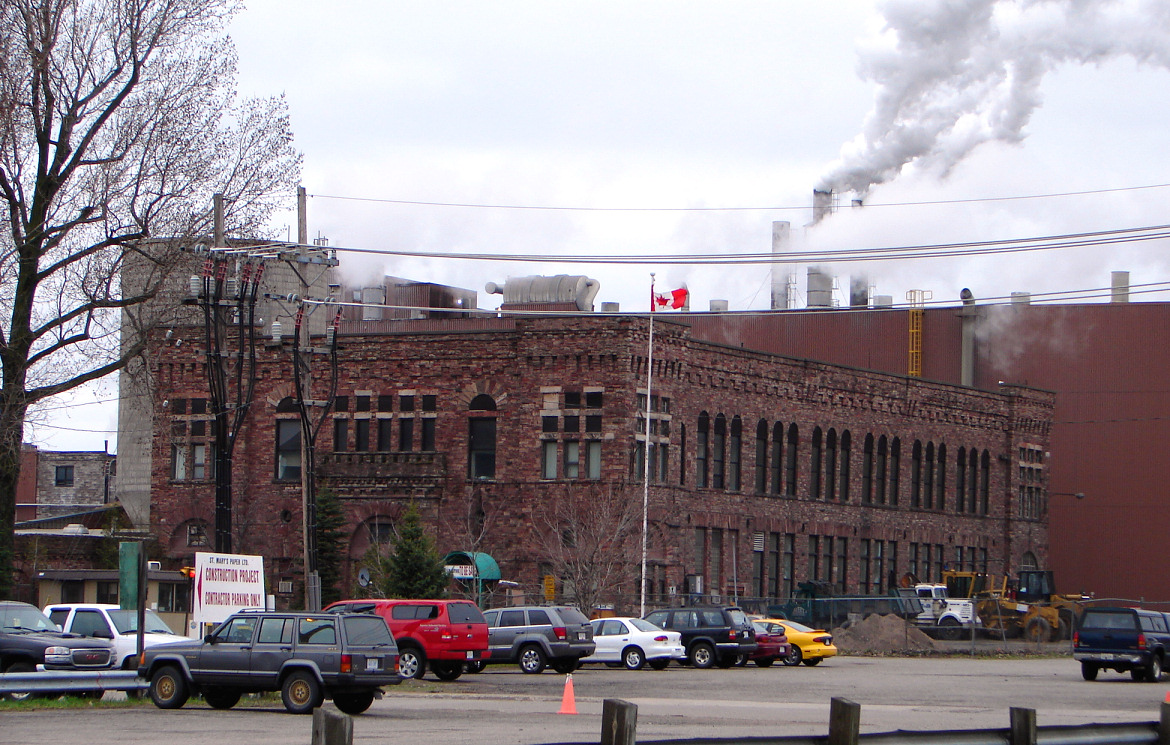
St. Mary's Paper, now closed

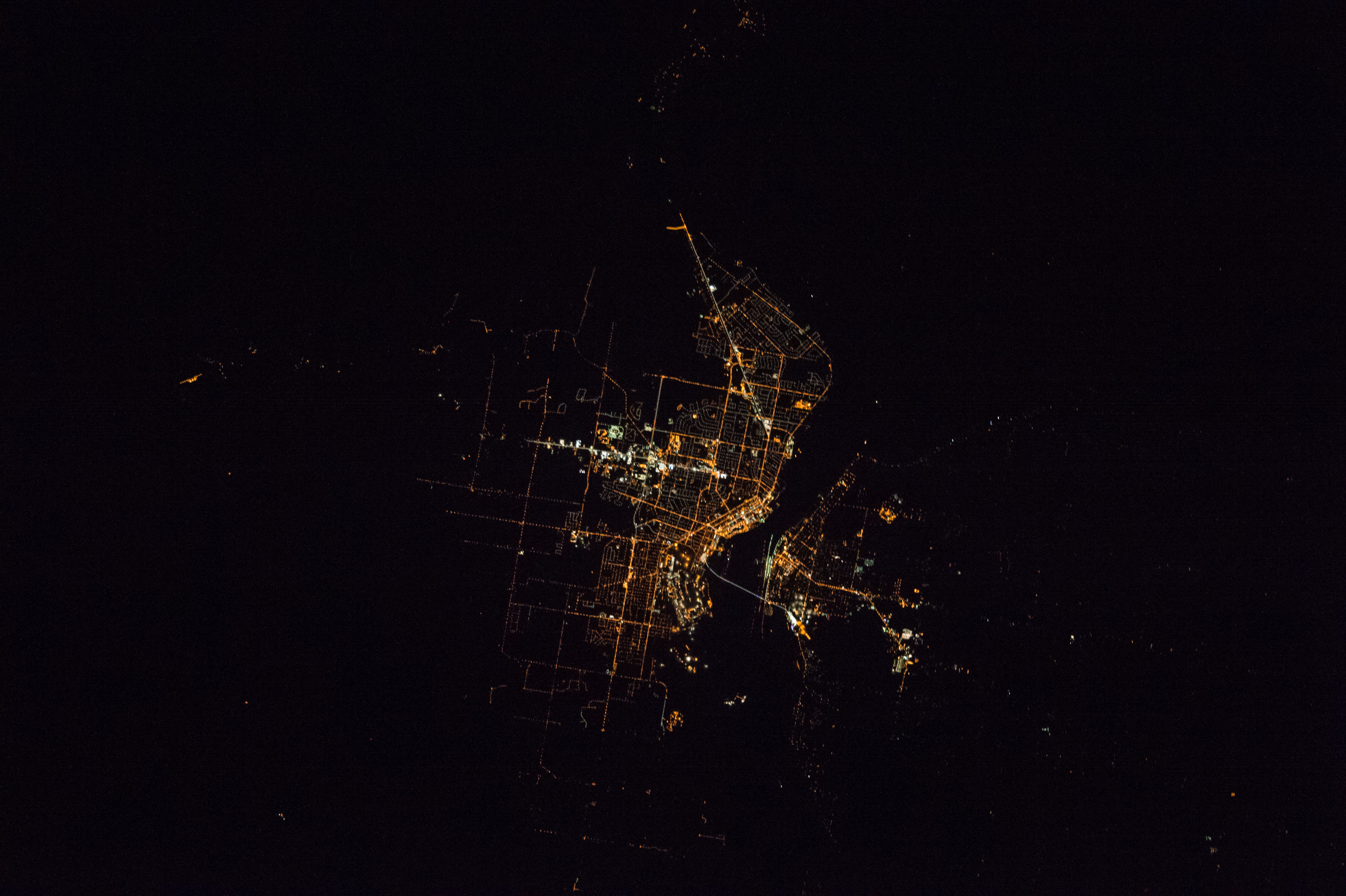
Sault Ste. Marie at night from the International Space Station in 2016

Sault Ste. Marie prospered during the 1960s and '70s, but as imported steel began to compete with domestic production, the local industry began to contract. Since the late 1980s, Algoma has declared bankruptcy twice and laid off large numbers of workers, adversely affecting the regional economy. Algoma was bailed out by the Ontario government with interest-free loans. The company had a swift turnaround in 2004 from its earlier financial troubles of the 1990s. China's increased demand for steel of the past decade has increased the price of steel. CEO Denis Turcotte was named "Canadian CEO of the year" in 2006 for his efforts. An offer to purchase ASI by the Essar Group (India) had been recommended by the ASI Board of Directors and was approved. The company was officially sold to the Essar Group in June 2007 for $1.6 billion.

Forestry is also a major local industry. St. Mary's Paper has been closed and decommissioned, although it was reopened in June 2007 and operated for a time under new ownership. Also related to wood products is ARAUCO, which employs over 110 people in the community. An adjacent melamine factory manufactures products with ARAUCO's materials. Examples are furniture and cupboards where a finish is added to the product. Together both of ARAUCO's factories employ about 150 people. The Huron Central Railway is important to these local industries as well.

The business process outsourcing industry had three call centres in the city, which together employed about 1,500 people. The largest, Sutherland Global Services, closed in 2019 and Agero closed in April 2020. Nucomm previously had a call centre here as well. The call centre industry became a major source of jobs and had contributed to the economic turnaround of the city in the late 1990s.

Another large employer in the community is the Ontario Lottery and Gaming Corporation (OLG). The OLG has a corporate office located on the waterfront. It employs a total of about 900 people in Sault Ste. Marie between the corporate office and OLG Casino Sault Ste. Marie. The prize centre used to be administered in the city but this operation was moved back to Toronto (York Mills) in 2009. The OLG is still the fourth-largest employer, after Algoma Steel, Sault Area Hospital, and the call centre industry.

Sault Ste. Marie is one of only a few cities in Ontario where a municipal bylaw prevents stores from opening on December 26, the day after Christmas, which is a Commonwealth holiday known as Boxing Day. Retail stores in Sault Ste. Marie begin their post-Christmas Boxing Day sales on December 27. A municipal referendum to determine whether voters favour allowing stores to open on Boxing Day was held concurrently with the 2010 municipal election. Voter turnout was not high enough to make the referendum legally binding, but 60.77 per cent of voters opposed allowing stores to open on the holiday.

== Alternative energy ==
The Sault Ste. Marie Solar Park (68 MW), co-generation plant (Brookfield Power), F. H. Clergue Hydroelectric Generating Station, nearby Prince Township Wind Farm (189 MW) and several nearby hydroelectric dams, form part of the city's push to develop alternative forms of energy and gain the title of 'Alternative Energy Capital of North America'. Two other wind farms are proposed for the area: the Goulais wind farm (25 MW) and the Bow Lake wind farm (58 MW), in partnership with the Batchewana First Nation to be built near Montreal River Harbour.

Elementa Group has built a pilot waste-to-energy plant in Sault Ste. Marie, and the local Public Utilities Commission (PUC) collects methane gas from the city's landfill. The city's street lights fully utilize LED technology and as recently as 2021, there has been progress made as the city has begun to budget for the purchase of electric vehicles, starting in 2022, to replace their fleet of gasoline powered vehicles. Sault Ste. Marie is also the location of the headquarters of Heliene, a solar energy equipment manufacturer.

In 2021, Sault Ste. Marie and the PUC began work on the Sault Smart Grid (SSG) Project. The project utilizes new technologies which will optimize voltage, automate distribution, and incorporate advanced metering infrastructure. It is expected to reduce electricity costs for residential and commercial customers of the PUC, and will help reduce the frequency and length of power outages through immediate location of outages and increased reliability of the power supply. It will also allow for efficient additions to the power grid in the future. The SSG was officially launched in November 2023, with Canadian prime minister Justin Trudeau in attendance.

== Transportation ==
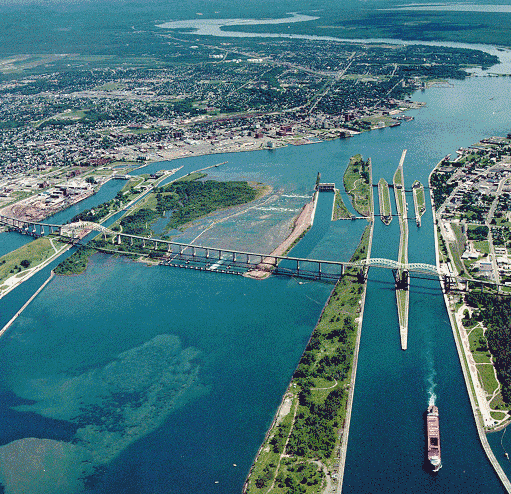
Sault Ste. Marie, Ontario (left), Soo Locks and International Bridge (centre), and Sault Ste. Marie, Michigan (right), with St. Marys River in the background

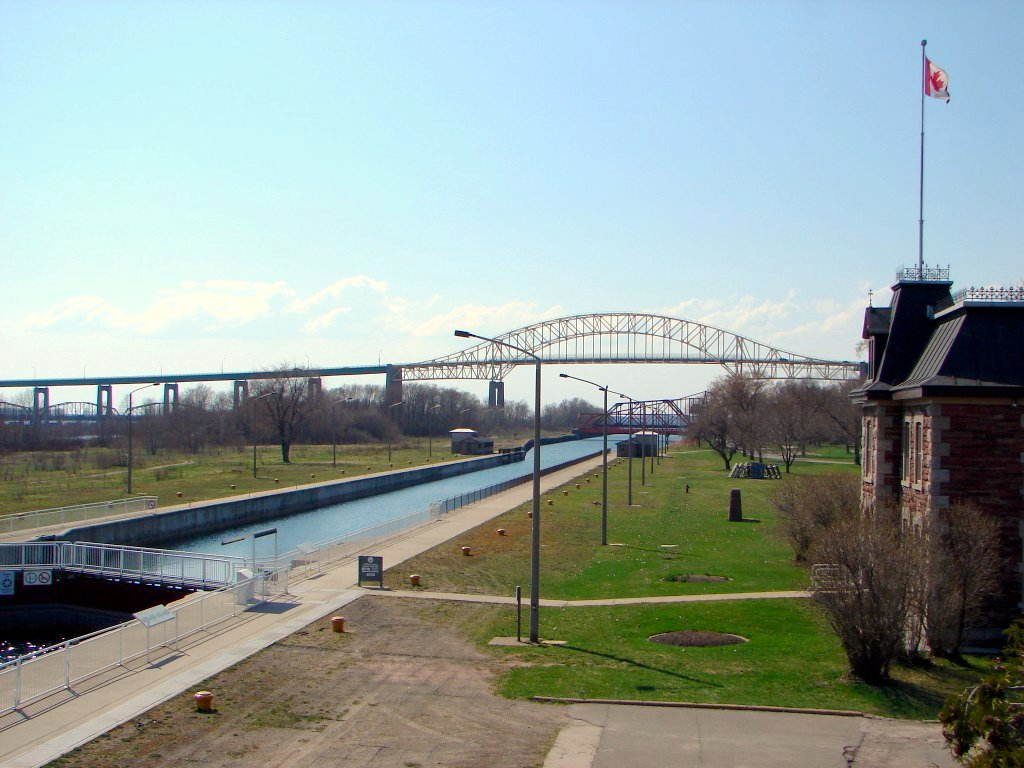
Sault Ste. Marie Canal, with the International Bridge and rail bridge in background

Sault Ste. Marie is served by Highway 17, designated as a segment of the Trans-Canada Highway in the region. The highway connects the city to Thunder Bay to the northwest and Sudbury to the east; the northern and eastern entrances to the city via Highway 17 are monitored by the Sault Ste. Marie Police Service with new cameras, scanning license plates upon entry/exit of the city—however as of April 2022, they are not yet fully operational. The International Bridge connects downtown Sault Ste. Marie to Sault Ste. Marie, Michigan, becoming Interstate 75 on the American side. Interstate 75 continues south to Saginaw, Flint, and Detroit before crossing into Ohio, eventually terminating in Hialeah, Florida, near Miami, and becoming toll roads SR 924 and SR 826.

The International Bridge also directs traffic from the American side of the border via Sault Ste. Marie's transport route, which runs from the International Bridge, travels along Carmen's Way to Second Line East, and then meets with Great Northern Road (Highway 17), where transports can either turn left to go north, towards Thunder Bay, or continue straight to go east, towards Sudbury. The section from Second Line East to Great Northern Road is also known as Ontario Highway 550, which runs from Great Northern Road and Second Line East to a roundabout in Gros Cap, the highway loops around the Sault Ste. Marie Public Utilities Commissions' water intake building. This newer limited-access roadway, known as "Carmen's Way" and named after the late MP Carmen Provenzano, has made it easier for transport trucks to reach Highway 17 and other major area roads. The route of Carmen's Way has a wide grassy right-of-way on both sides of the roadway, to facilitate future expansion of its lane capacity. Planning was underway to eventually connect the Second Line East and Black Road intersection to the new four-lane section of Highway 17, which opened east of the city in 2007—however as of 2022, there has been no environmental impact assessment initiated by the Ministry of Transportation.

The city plays an inherited role in marine transportation, with the locks in Michigan being an integral component of the St. Lawrence Seaway. The city operates its own small-scale lock which is used by small boats and other pleasure craft in the summer. Also recently opened is a multi-modal terminal designed to take advantage of the Sault as a rail, road, and water transportation hub. Cruise ships often dock at Roberta Bondar Park, which includes a large pavilion, small farmers market, a BeaverTails outlet, a small canteen, a marina, public washrooms, a Roberta Bondar statue, and green space; located to the right (looking at the city from the waterfront) is Montana's and the newly renovated City Hall, and to the left, Delta Sault Ste. Marie Waterfront and the Station Mall.

Sault Ste. Marie is also served by Sault Ste. Marie Airport and Sault Transit Services. The city is no longer connected by passenger rail to any other major cities, but is part of the Agawa Canyon Railroad network, which runs north from the city to the small town of Oba. In 2006 the city's Member of Parliament, Tony Martin, called for passenger rail service to be reinstated between Sault Ste. Marie and Sudbury. Freight service is provided by the Agawa Canyon Railroad, the Huron Central Railway, and the Canadian National Railway.

In 2018, Ontario Northland announced a major service expansion west of Sudbury, which includes multiple stops in Sault Ste. Marie. Passengers may board buses headed toward Hearst, Sudbury, or Manitoulin Island. ONTC currently has three stops in the city, with the main stop being along Trunk Road in the east end, and the other stops being at Sault College and the hospital.

Sault Ste. Marie does not have Lyft or Uber, but has three ridesharing companies that focus on small communities called URide, EZ Ride and Driverseat. The city has taxi services offered by Hollywood Airport Shuttle & Limousines, Soo Yellow Cab, and UCab.

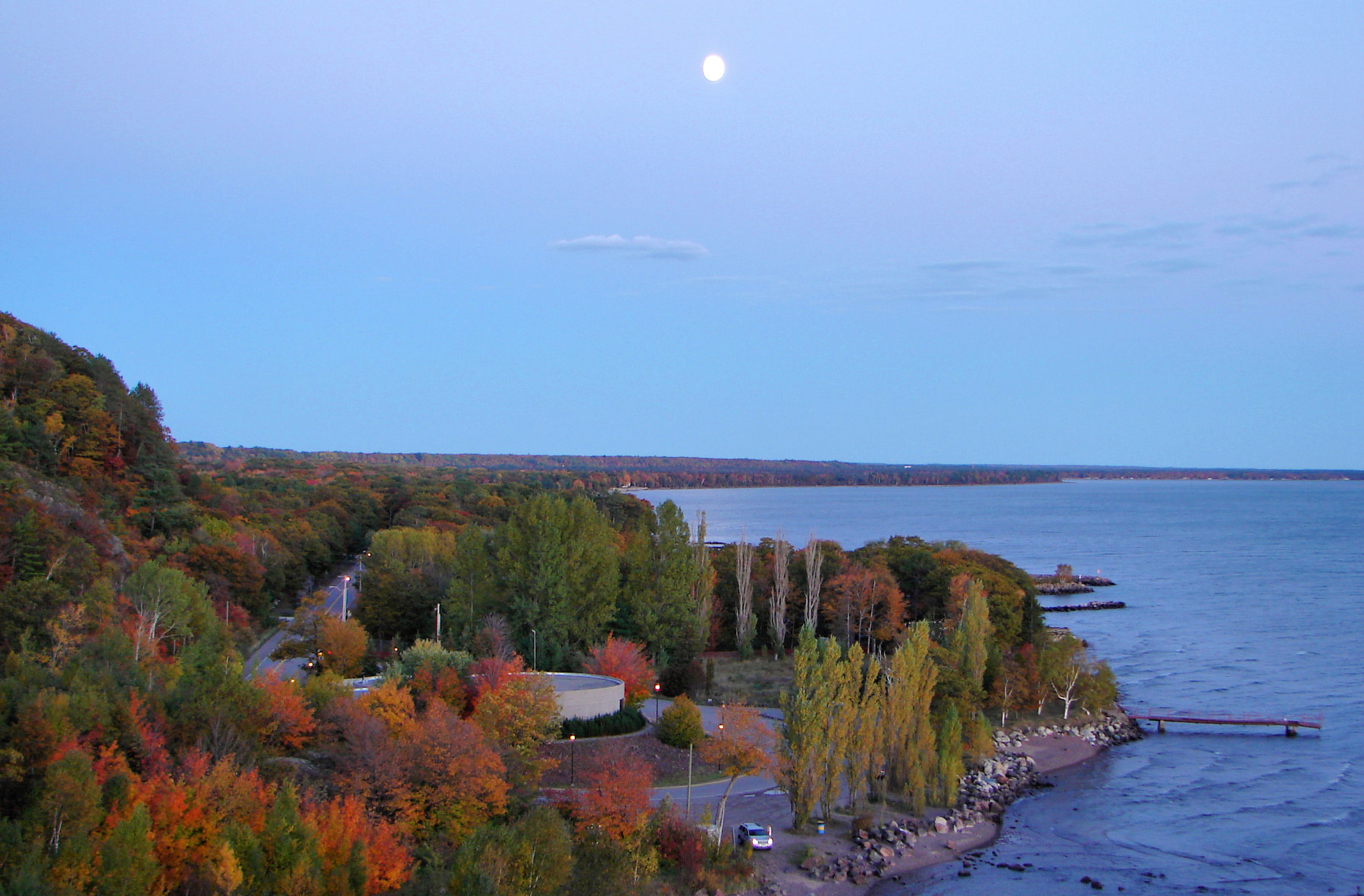
The Highway 550 roundabout in Gros Cap with the PUC's water intake building shown in the middle

== Tourism ==
Local area attractions include the Canadian Bushplane Heritage Centre, Entomica Insectarium, the Sault Ste. Marie Museum, the Sault Ste. Marie Canal National Historic Site, boat tours of the Sault locks (which connect Lake Superior with the lower Great Lakes), Whitefish Island, the Ermatinger Clergue National Historic Site, Casino Sault Ste. Marie, the Art Gallery of Algoma and the Algoma Central Railway's popular Agawa Canyon Tour Train.

The MS Norgoma, a Canadian passenger ship, was a museum ship in the Great Lakes at Sault Ste. Marie. This ship is no longer docked in Sault Ste. Marie.

Nearby parks include Pancake Bay Provincial Park, Batchawana Bay Provincial Park and Lake Superior Provincial Park. Winter activities are also an asset to Sault Ste Marie's tourism industry with the annual Bon Soo Winter Carnival, Searchmont Resort as a great ski and snowboard destination, Stokely Creek Lodge (cross country ski resort) and Hiawatha a nearby cross country ski trails. The city also hosts a large snowmobile trail system that criss-crosses the province of Ontario.

A new non-motorized HUB trail, named the John Rowswell Hub Trail, was built around the city (25 km or 16 mi) so that walkers, rollerbladers and cyclists (snowshoeing and cross country skiing in winter) can enjoy the 'beautiful and convenient' circle tour around town. The Voyageur Hiking Trail, a long-distance trail that will eventually span from Sudbury to Thunder Bay, originated in Sault Ste. Marie in 1973. The Roberta Bondar Park and Pavilion, most famous for its unique tent design, was created to commemorate the first Canadian female astronaut to go into space and regularly hosts community events; the parking lot has spaces for farmers market vendors and the pavilion also has a BeaverTails, a canteen, and overlooks the St. Mary's River. The park is often most active in the spring and summer and is located in between Montana's and Delta Sault Ste. Marie Waterfront, with the Roberta Bondar Place directly to the North, which consists of the OLG headquarters and other provincial government offices.

Sault Ste. Marie has an extensive mountain biking network and has invested in new trails in the Hiawatha area of the city. The Algoma Trail Network plans to add more trails to the existing 30–40 km (19–25 mi) network, with initial work being completed by September 2021.

In August 2021, Sail Superior ran tours of their Zodiac Hurricane boat with tours departing from the Roberta Bondar marina.

One of the major draws to the area from the months of June to October is the Agawa Canyon Tour Train. This one-day wilderness excursion travels 114 miles north of Sault Ste. Marie, alongside pristine northern lakes and rivers and through the awesome granite rock formations and vast mixed forests of the Canadian Shield, eventually ending at the Agawa Canyon. The train departs at 8am and returns to Sault Ste. Marie by 6pm. In August 2021 a new train station was opened for the tour train, the Canal district of the city.

The city is also home to the Station Mall, one of the largest shopping malls in Northern Ontario.

In 2020, Sault Ste. Marie city council voted in favour of developing a downtown plaza, located between Spring and Brock Street—the plaza eliminated Bingham Street and formed a large common area with a fountain/skating surface, restrooms and changing rooms, a large screen, event space, a Tim Hortons (located in existing building), and the Soo Market, with other businesses and attractions expected to open as a result of development. The plaza has already started to increase and stimulate development in the area, with a new $16 million office building constructed nearby. The space also includes retail units and is largely modeled after similar concepts such as the Market Square in Guelph, or Pat Bayly Square in Ajax. Construction on the plaza started in Spring 2022 and was completed by November 2023. The plaza has been the subject of controversy throughout its planning stages and beyond as some citizens feel it is not needed and is too costly; the plaza was part of the array of suggestions made by Roger Brooks—a tourism and city centre consultant hired through a conjoined effort between the city and downtown association in 2018. Many community events, including an Arts and Culture festival, battle of the bands event,, and hockey viewing parties have been held there.

== Demographics ==
Historical populations
Year	Pop.	±%
1871	879	—
1881	780	−11.3%
1891	2,414	+209.5%
1901	7,169	+197.0%
1911	10,984	+53.2%
1921	21,092	+92.0%
1931	23,082	+9.4%
1941	25,620	+11.0%
1951	32,452	+26.7%
1961	43,088	+32.8%
1971	80,332	+86.4%
1981	82,697	+2.9%
1991	81,476	−1.5%
1996	80,054	−1.7%
2001	74,566	−6.9%
2006	74,948	+0.5%
2011	75,141	+0.3%
2016	73,368	−2.4%
2021	72,051	−1.8%

In the 2021 Census of Population conducted by Statistics Canada, Sault Ste. Marie had a population of 72,051 living in 32,530 of its 34,818 total private dwellings, a change of −1.8% from its 2016 population of 73,368. With a land area of 221.99 km^{2} (85.71 sq mi), it had a population density of 324.6/km^{2} (840.6/sq mi) in 2021.

The city's census agglomeration had a total population of 76,731, down 1.8% from 78,159 in 2016

=== Ethnicity ===
Largest ethnic origin in Sault Ste. Marie CA by census tract based on the 2021 census

Sault Ste. Marie was at one time a haven for Italian immigrants. The city has a large concentration of ethnic Italians for a community its size, mostly descending from the southern region of Calabria.

Those who are of European origin constitute 82% of the population, Aboriginals or Native Canadians, constitute 13.5%, and visible minorities make up 4.5%.

Panethnic groups in the City of Sault Ste. Marie (2001−2021)
Panethnic group	2021		2016		2011		2006		2001	
Panethnic group	Pop.	%	Pop.	%	Pop.	%	Pop.	%	Pop.	%
European (Note: Statistic includes all persons that did not make up part of a visible minority or an indigenous identity.)	59,090	83.54%	61,760	85.92%	65,675	89.2%	66,970	90.63%	68,015	92.57%
Indigenous	8,430	11.92%	8,120	11.3%	6,740	9.15%	5,980	8.09%	4,525	6.16%
South Asian	1,135	1.6%	485	0.67%	275	0.37%	95	0.13%	155	0.21%
African	635	0.9%	490	0.68%	260	0.35%	235	0.32%	135	0.18%
East Asian (Note: Statistic includes total responses of "Chinese", "Korean", and "Japanese" under visible minority section on census.)	605	0.86%	480	0.67%	355	0.48%	340	0.46%	340	0.46%
Southeast Asian (Note: Statistic includes total responses of "Filipino" and "Southeast Asian" under visible minority section on census.)	255	0.36%	115	0.16%	75	0.1%	95	0.13%	185	0.25%
Latin American	215	0.3%	75	0.1%	110	0.15%	90	0.12%	50	0.07%
Middle Eastern (Note: Statistic includes total responses of "West Asian" and "Arab" under visible minority section on census.)	195	0.28%	235	0.33%	85	0.12%	30	0.04%	40	0.05%
Other/multiracial (Note: Statistic includes total responses of "Visible minority, n.i.e." and "Multiple visible minorities" under visible minority section on census.)	175	0.25%	120	0.17%	35	0.05%	90	0.12%	25	0.03%
Total responses	70,735	98.17%	71,880	97.97%	73,625	97.98%	73,890	98.59%	73,475	98.54%
Total population	72,051	100%	73,368	100%	75,141	100%	74,948	100%	74,566	100%
Note: Totals greater than 100% due to multiple origin responses

=== Religion ===
Religions in Sault Ste. Marie
Religion	Percent
No Religion/Secular	38%
Catholic Christian	33%
Protestant Christians	16%
Christian N.O.S	5%
Other Christian/Christian-Related Tradition	4%
Other Religions	3%
2021 Census Profile

Largest non-Christian religion in Sault Ste. Marie CA by census tracts based based on the 2021 census

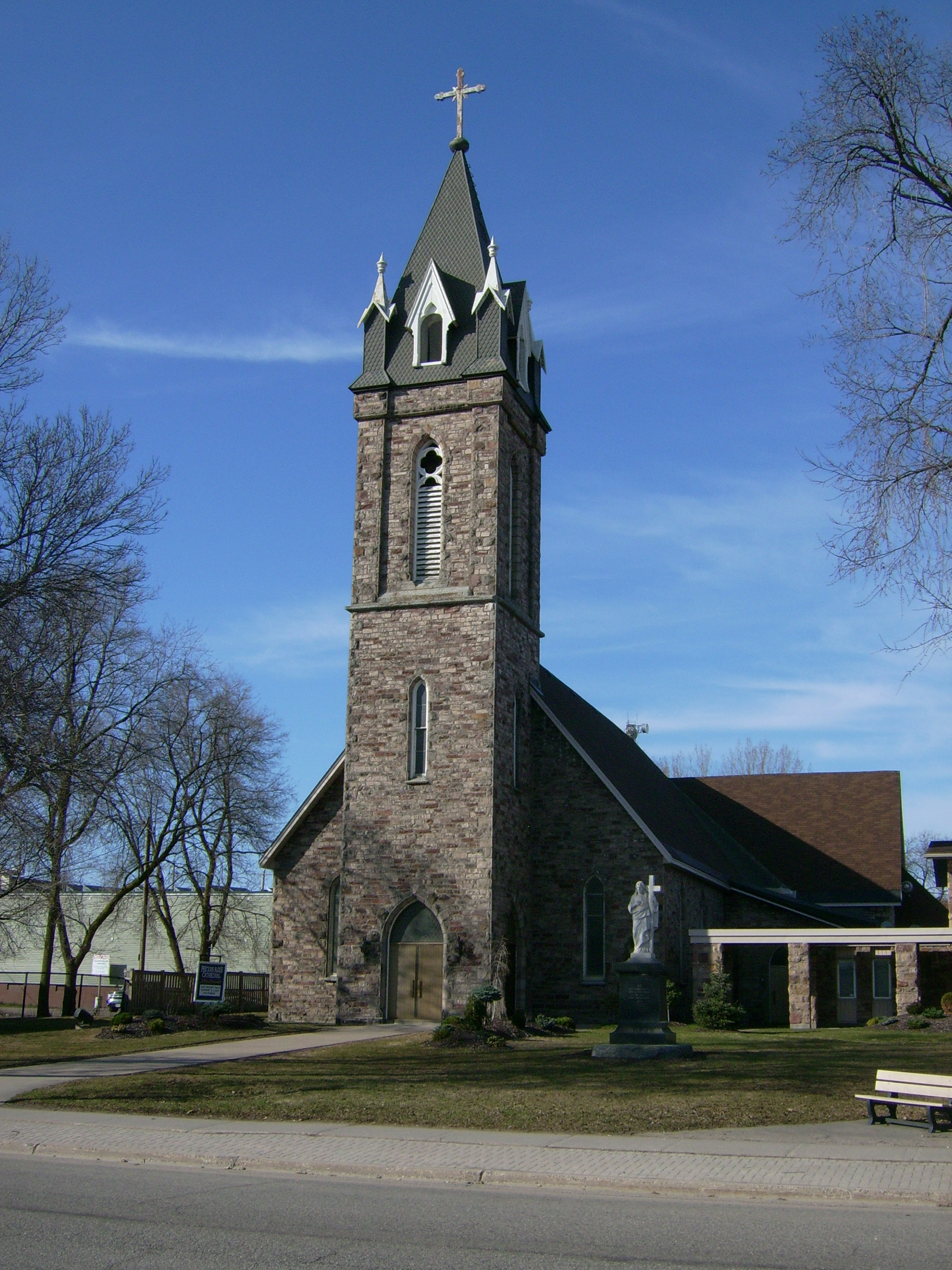
Precious Blood Cathedral, Roman Catholic Diocese of Sault Sainte Marie

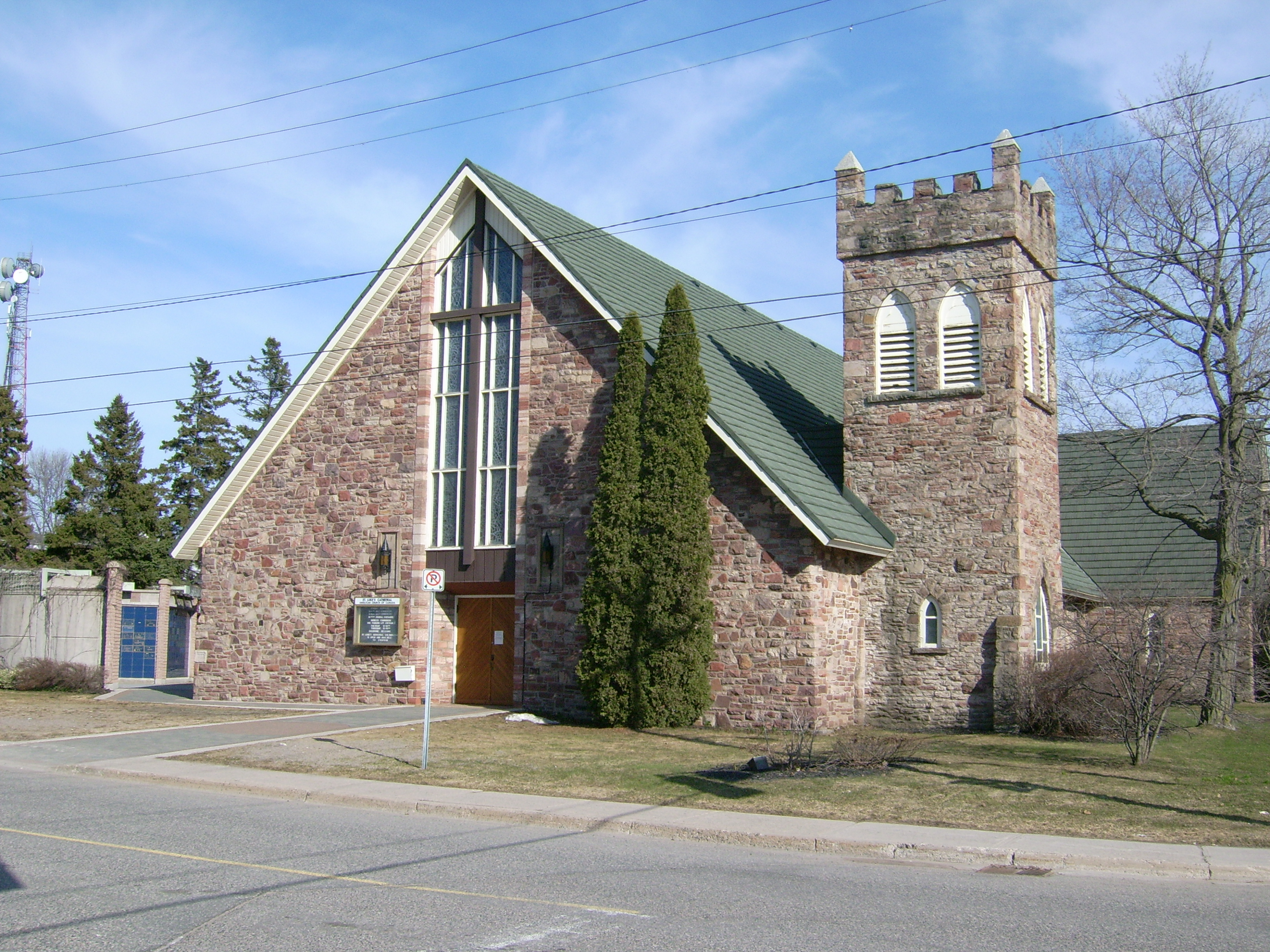
St. Luke's Cathedral, Anglican Diocese of Algoma

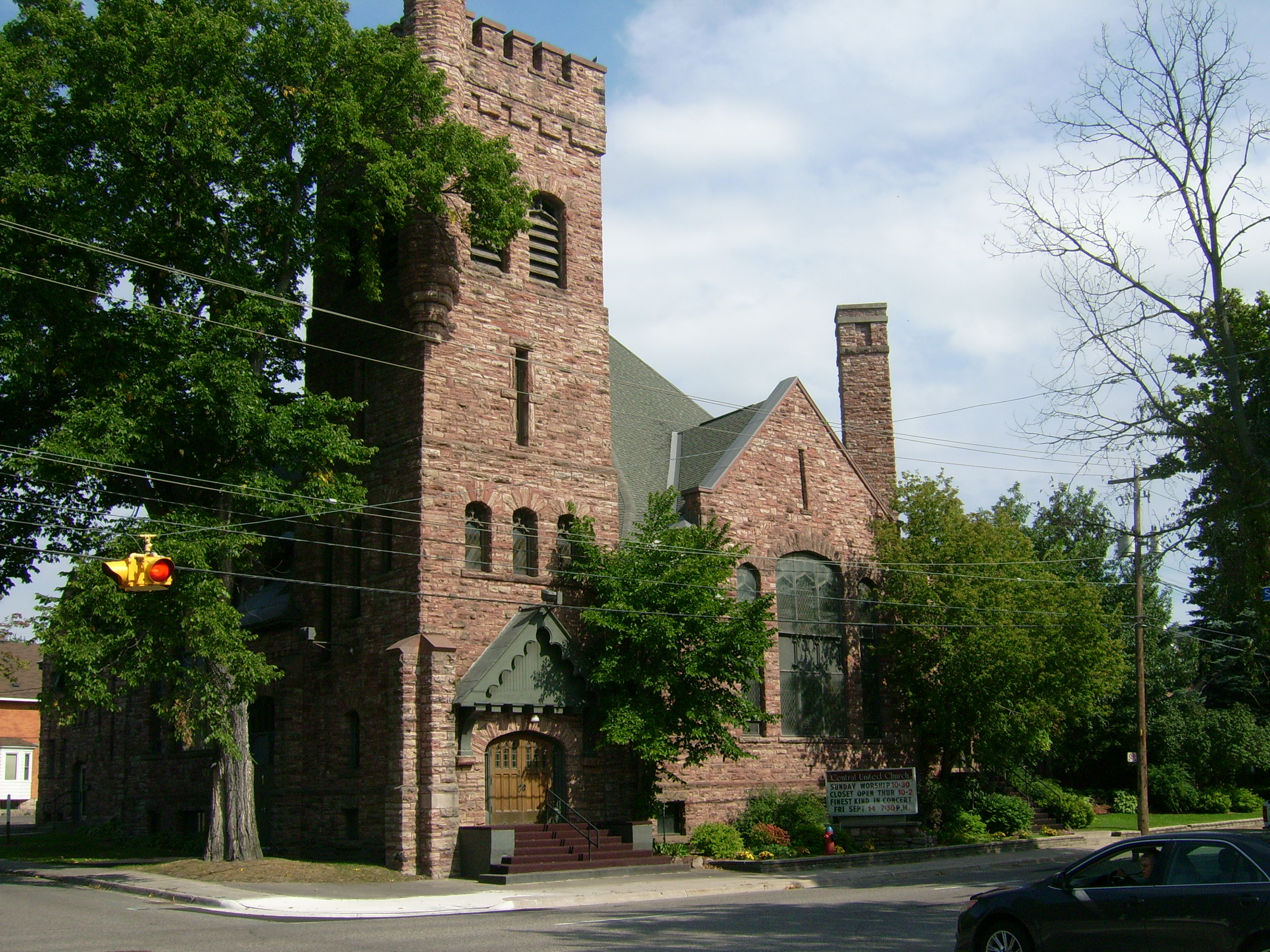
Central United Church

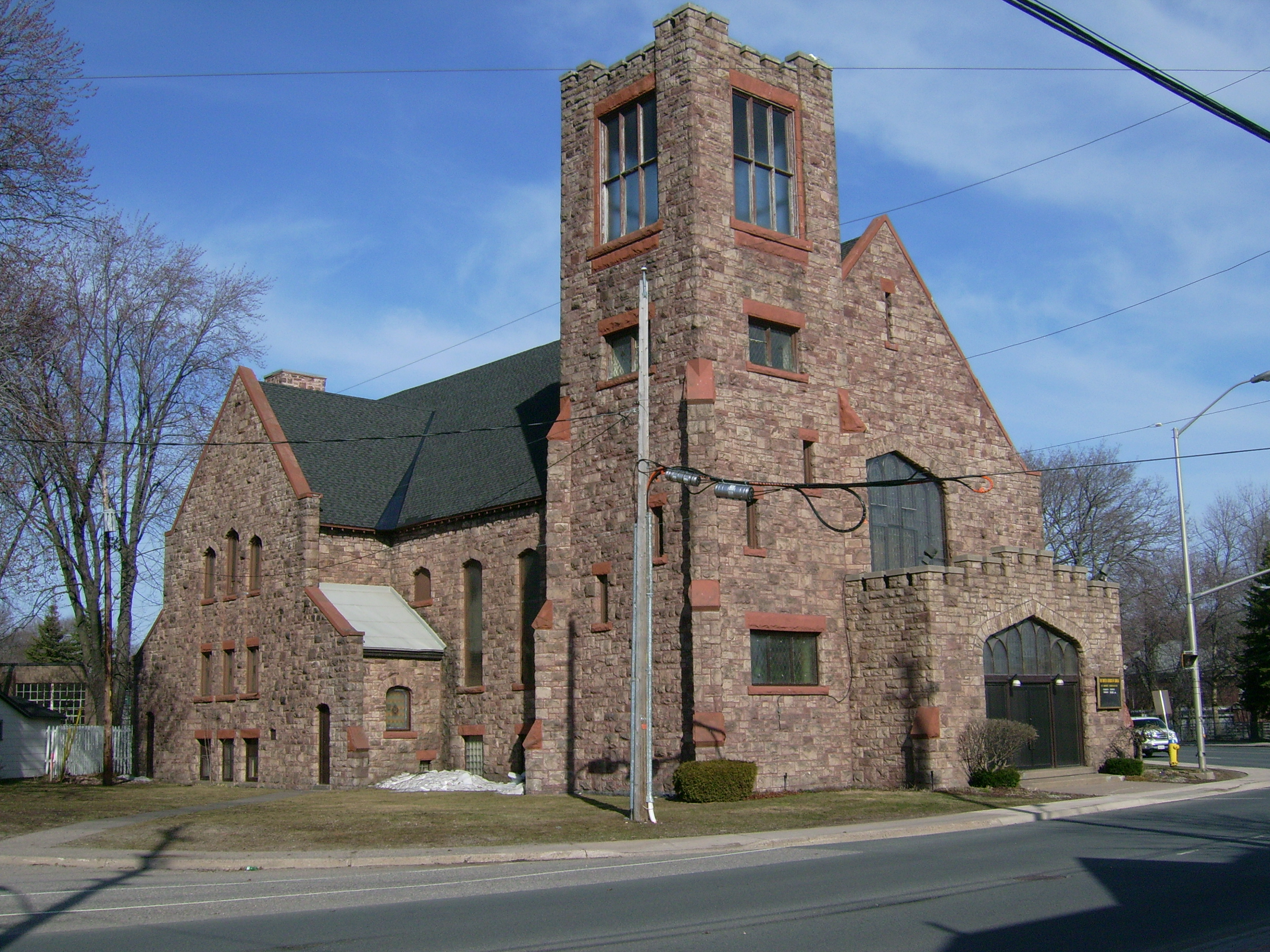
St. Andrew's United Church

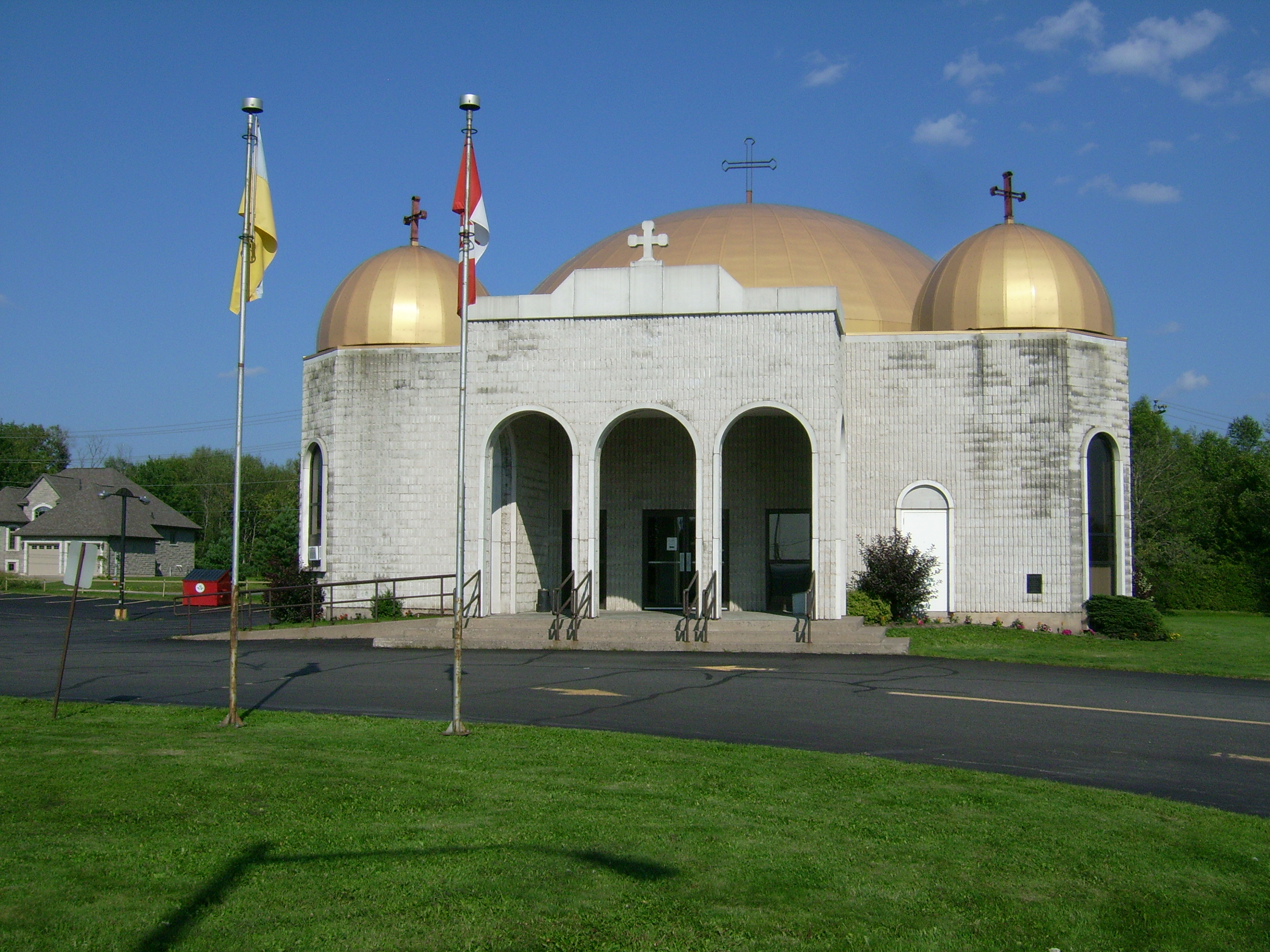
St. Mary's Ukrainian Catholic Church

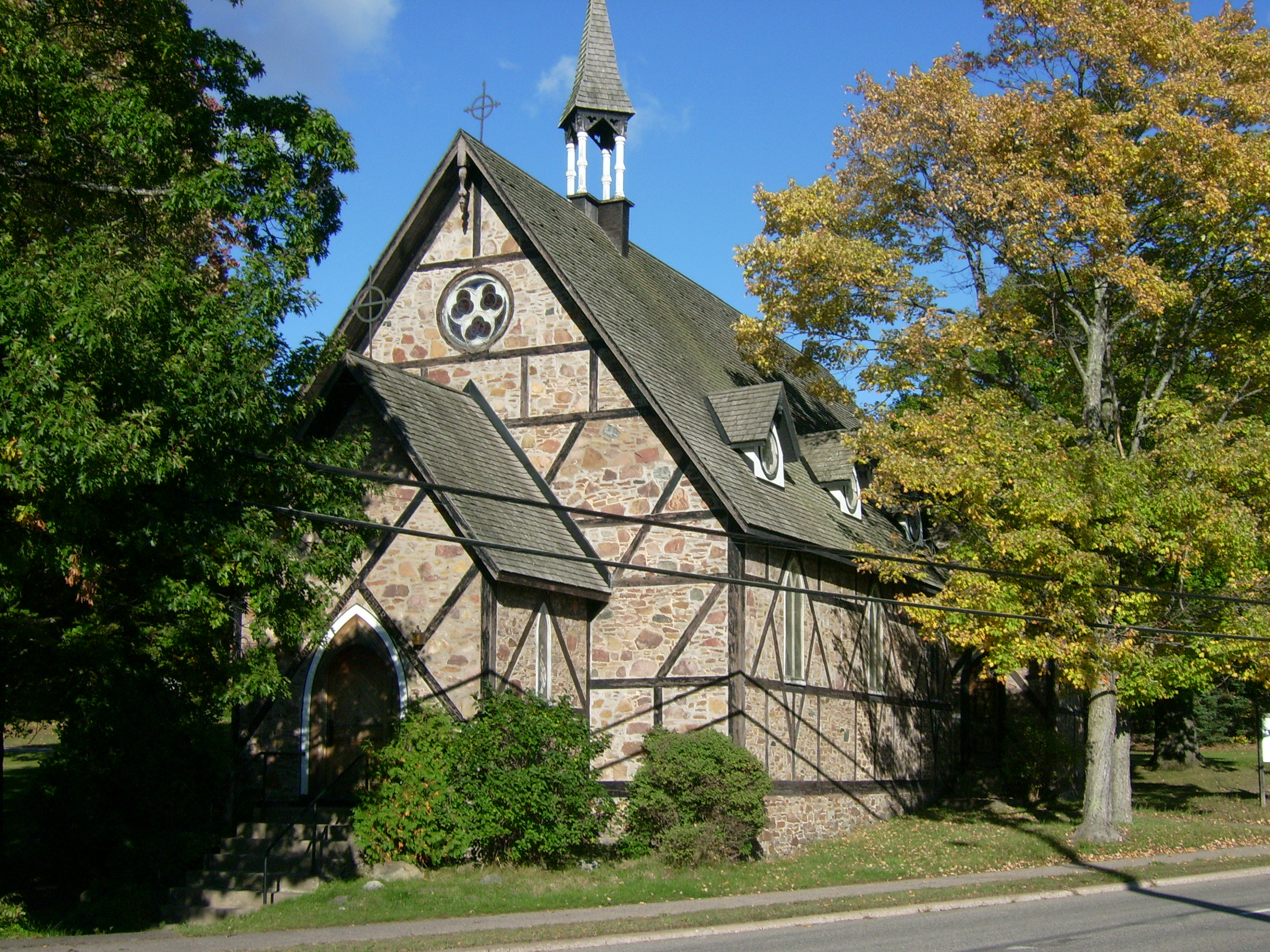
Bishop Fauquier Memorial Chapel

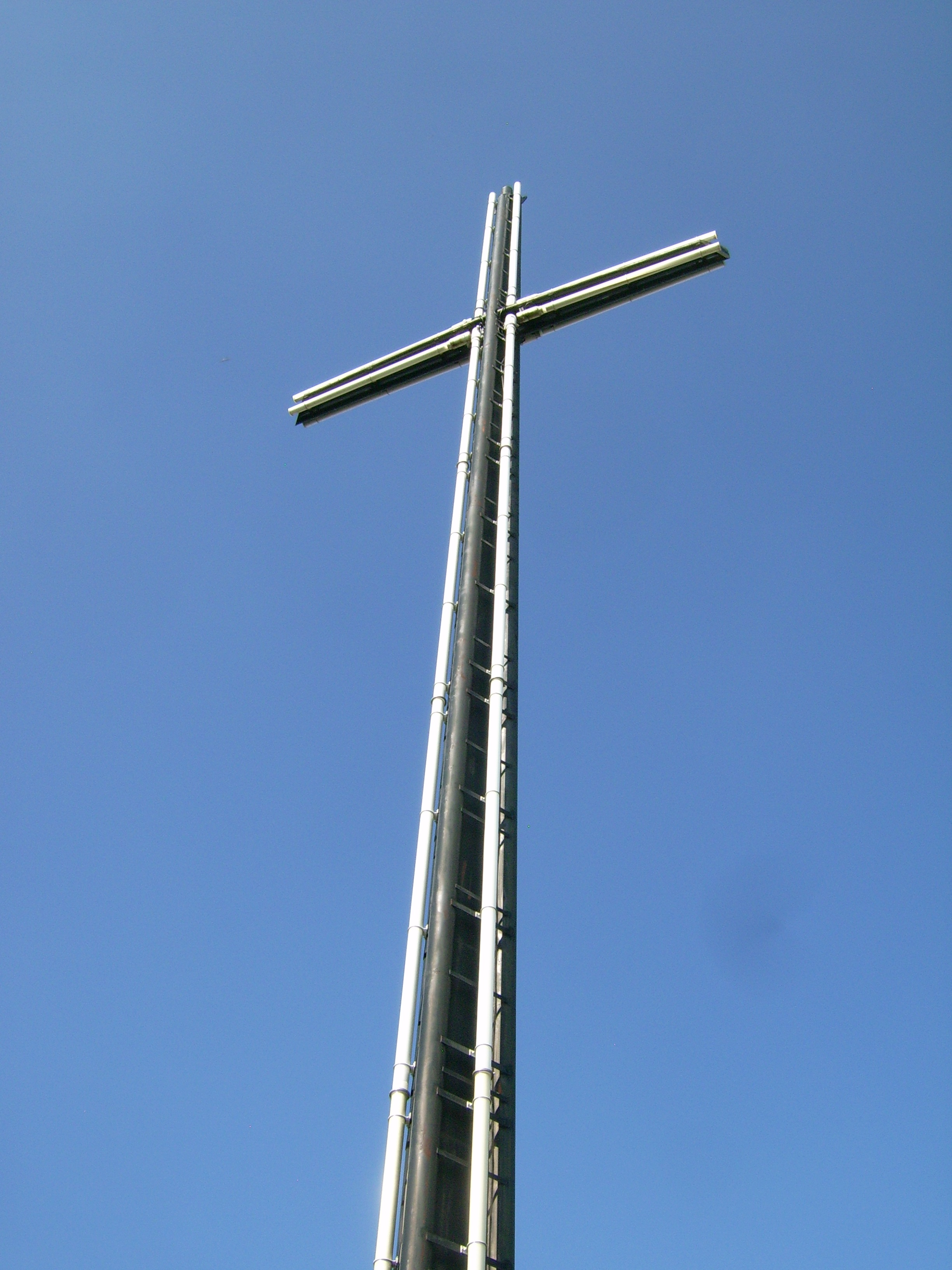
St. Mary's Cross, an illuminated 37 m summit cross

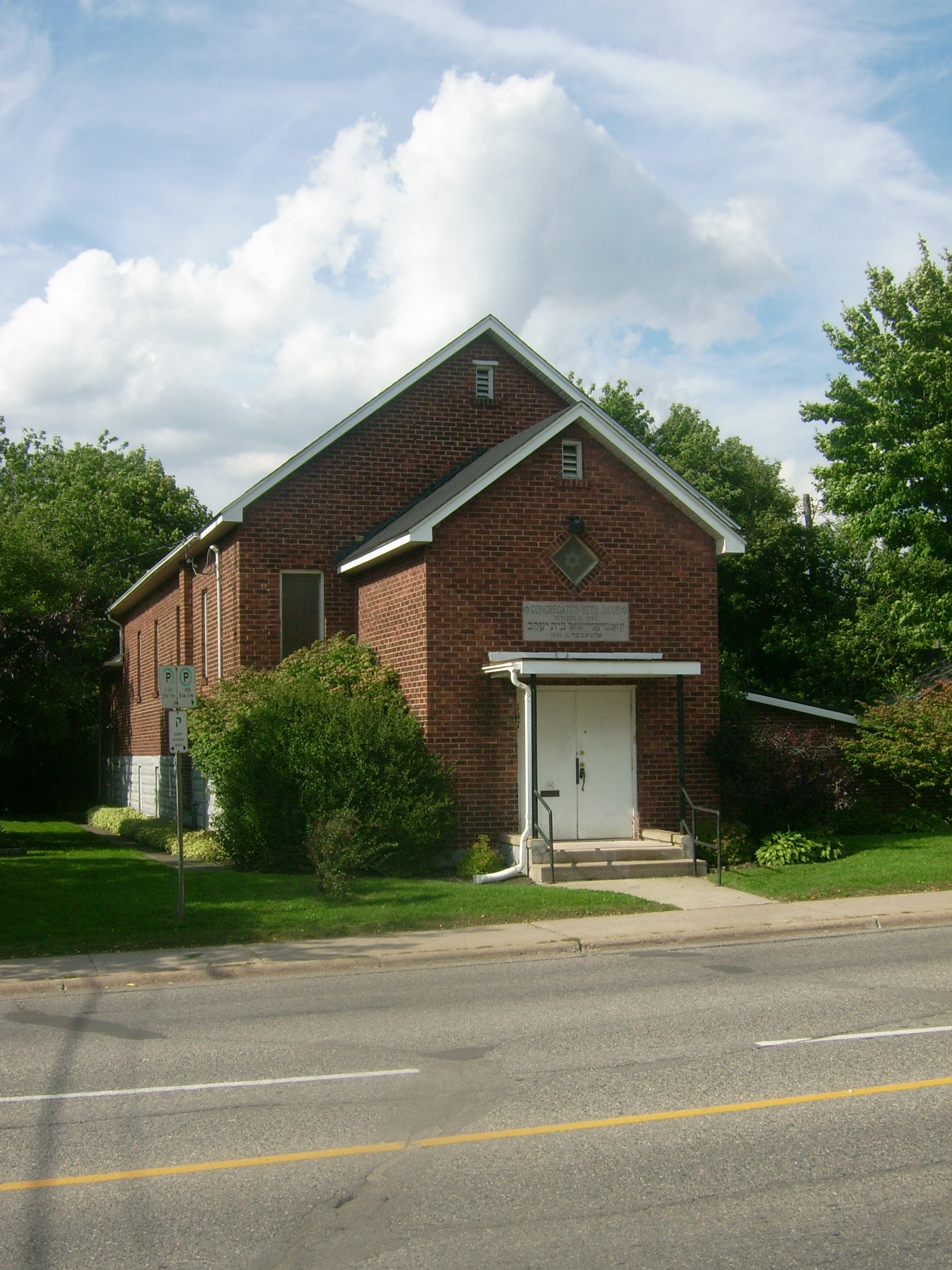
Beth Jacob Synagogue

== Government ==
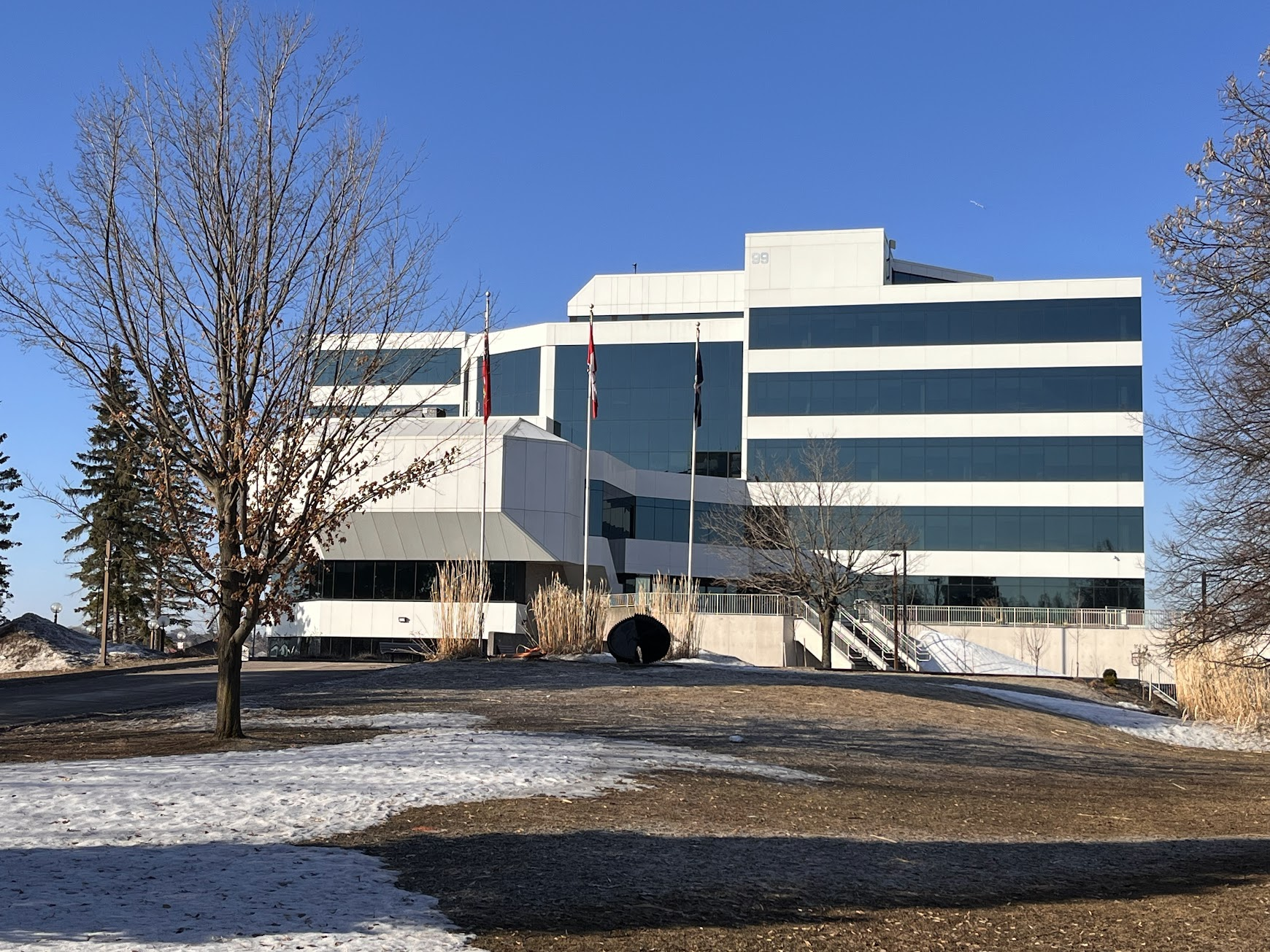
Sault Ste. Marie's Ronald A. Irwin Civic Centre

The city is governed by a council that consists of ten councillors representing five wards and a mayor. Under the authority of Ontario's Municipal Act, 2001 the council serves a four year term.

The most recent municipal election was held on October 24, 2022. The current mayor is Matthew Shoemaker.

The city government operates under the legal name "The Corporation of the City of Sault Ste. Marie".

The city was incorporated by an act of the provincial legislature on April 16, 1912. It had operated as a township from 1887 to 1912 and was first incorporated as a village on July 29, 1871, when the population was about 880.

The city's coat of arms adopted in 2013, contains the Ojibwe motto "Ojibwe Gchi Gami Odena" meaning "settlement near the Ojibwe's big lake". A version of this motto appeared on the original crest at the time the city was incorporated in 1912.

Residents of the city are represented in the federal House of Commons by the member of parliament for the electoral district of Sault Ste. Marie—Algoma. Created in the 2022 federal electoral district redistribution process, the district is a mixed rural and urban riding covering 40,066 km^{2} centred around the city of Sault Ste. Marie. The riding extends northward just beyond Hornepayne, and eastward along the north shore of Lake Huron to just beyond the town of Spanish. The current Member of Parliament is Terry Sheehan (Liberal).

Provincially, residents of the city are represented in the Ontario legislature by the member of provincial parliament for Sault Ste. Marie. This district encompasses the city alone. The current member is Chris Scott who sits as an independent.

== Education ==
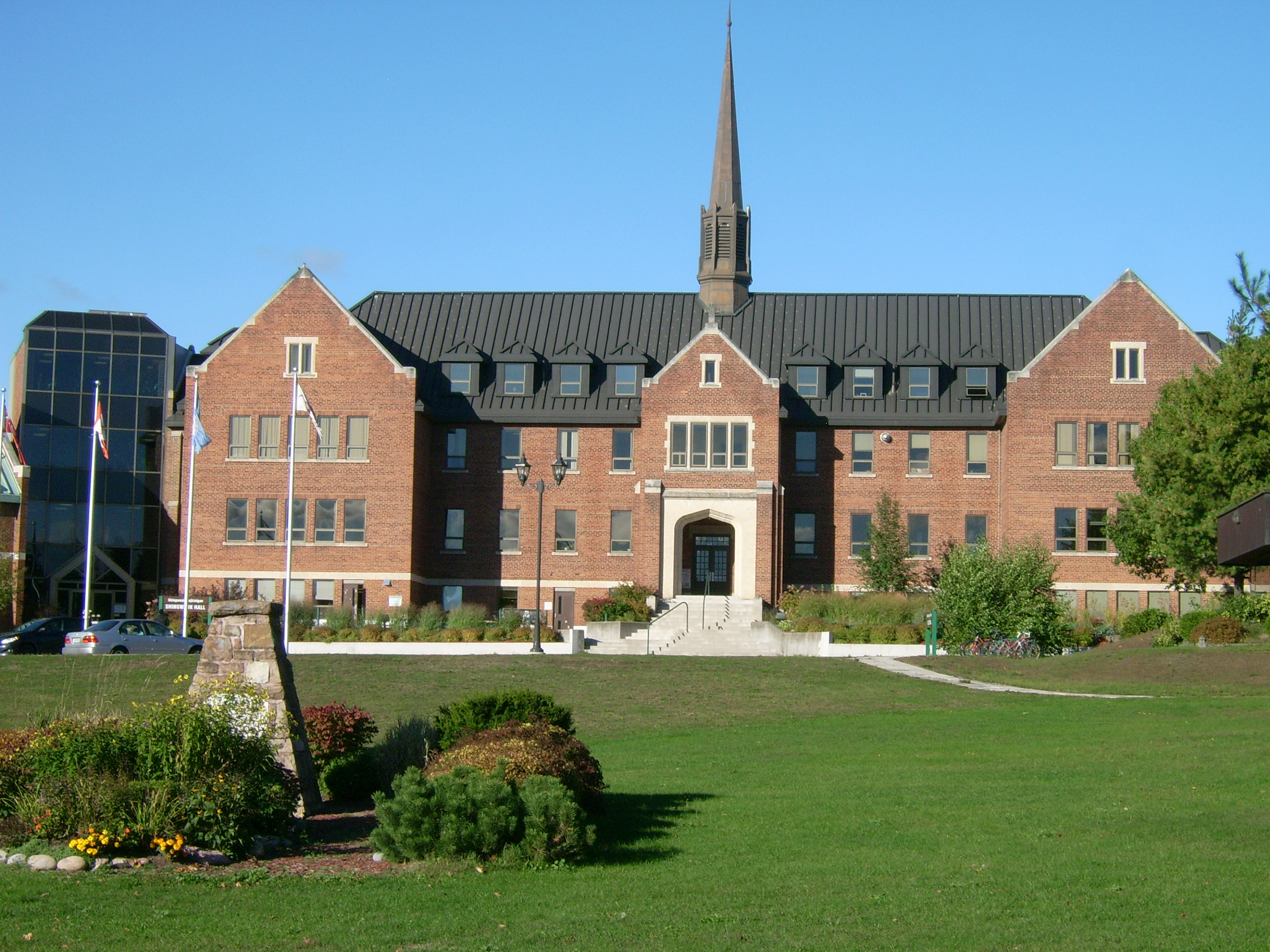
Shingwauk Hall, Algoma University

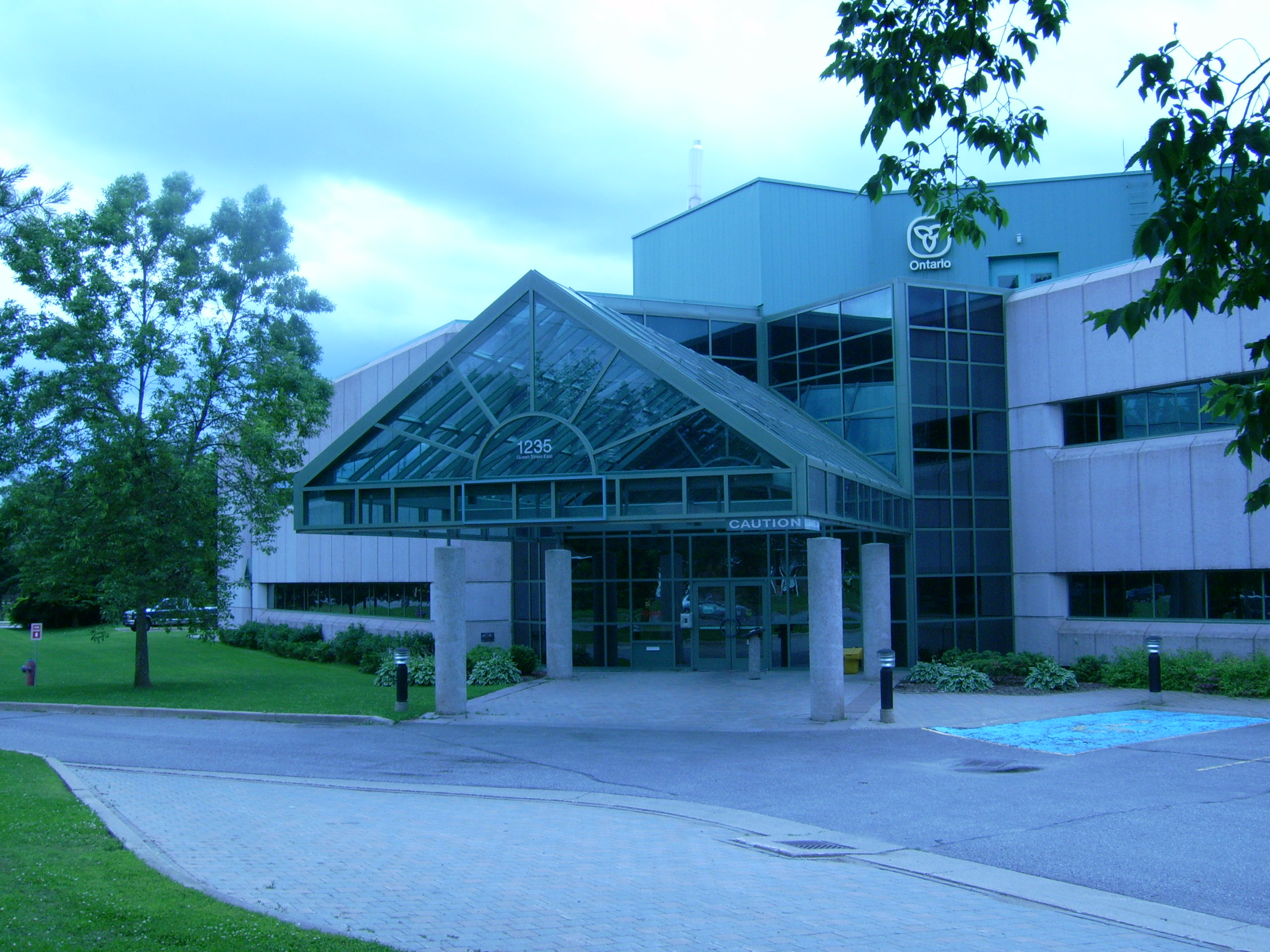
Ontario Forest Research Institute

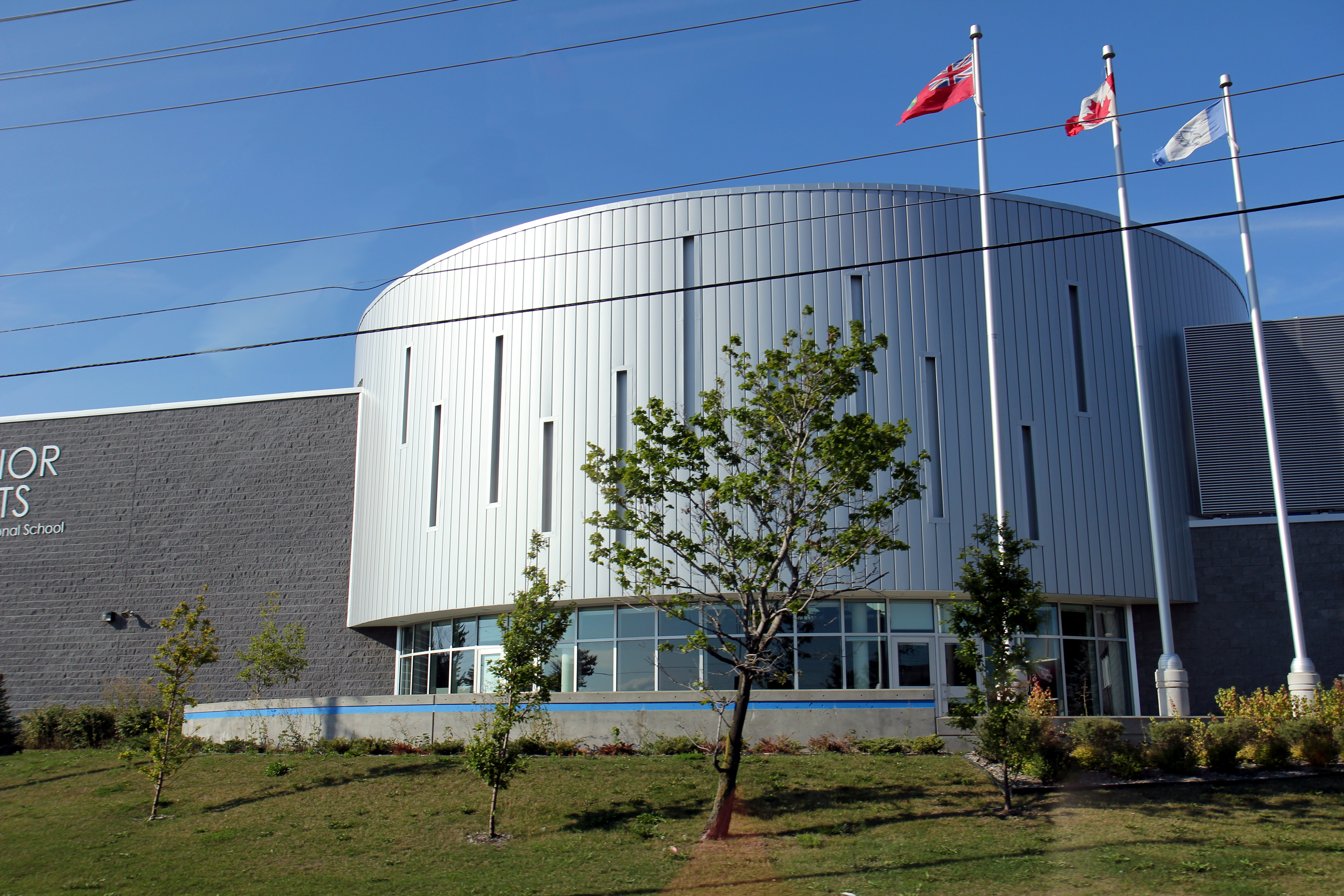
Superior Heights Collegiate & Vocational School

The city is home to Sault College, a college of applied arts and technology, and to Algoma University. While the vast majority of programs at Algoma University and Sault College are delivered on the respective campuses, both institutions also offer joint programs with Lake Superior State University in Sault Ste. Marie, Michigan. On June 18, 2008, Algoma University became an independent university, ending its longtime affiliation with Laurentian University in Sudbury. A new school, Shingwauk Kinoomaage Gamig (University), is poised to launch as a federated school of Algoma University. It will offer courses in Anishinaabe culture and language.

Sault Ste. Marie is home to the Algoma District School Board and to the Huron-Superior Catholic District School Board. It is part of the Conseil scolaire de district du Grand Nord de l'Ontario and the Conseil scolaire de district catholique du Nouvel-Ontario. It is also home to the following high schools:

- Korah Collegiate & Vocational School (English, public, offers the International Baccalaureate Programme)
- École Notre-Dame-du-Sault (French, Catholic)
- St. Mary's College (English with French Immersion Program, Catholic, offers Advanced Placement programs)
- Superior Heights Collegitate & Vocational school (English and French Immersion, public, offers Advanced Placement programs)
- White Pines Collegiate & Vocational School (English, public)

Sault Ste. Marie is also home to the Ontario Forest Research Institute and the federal Great Lakes Forestry Centre.

Sault Ste. Marie has over 30 elementary schools.

== Sports ==
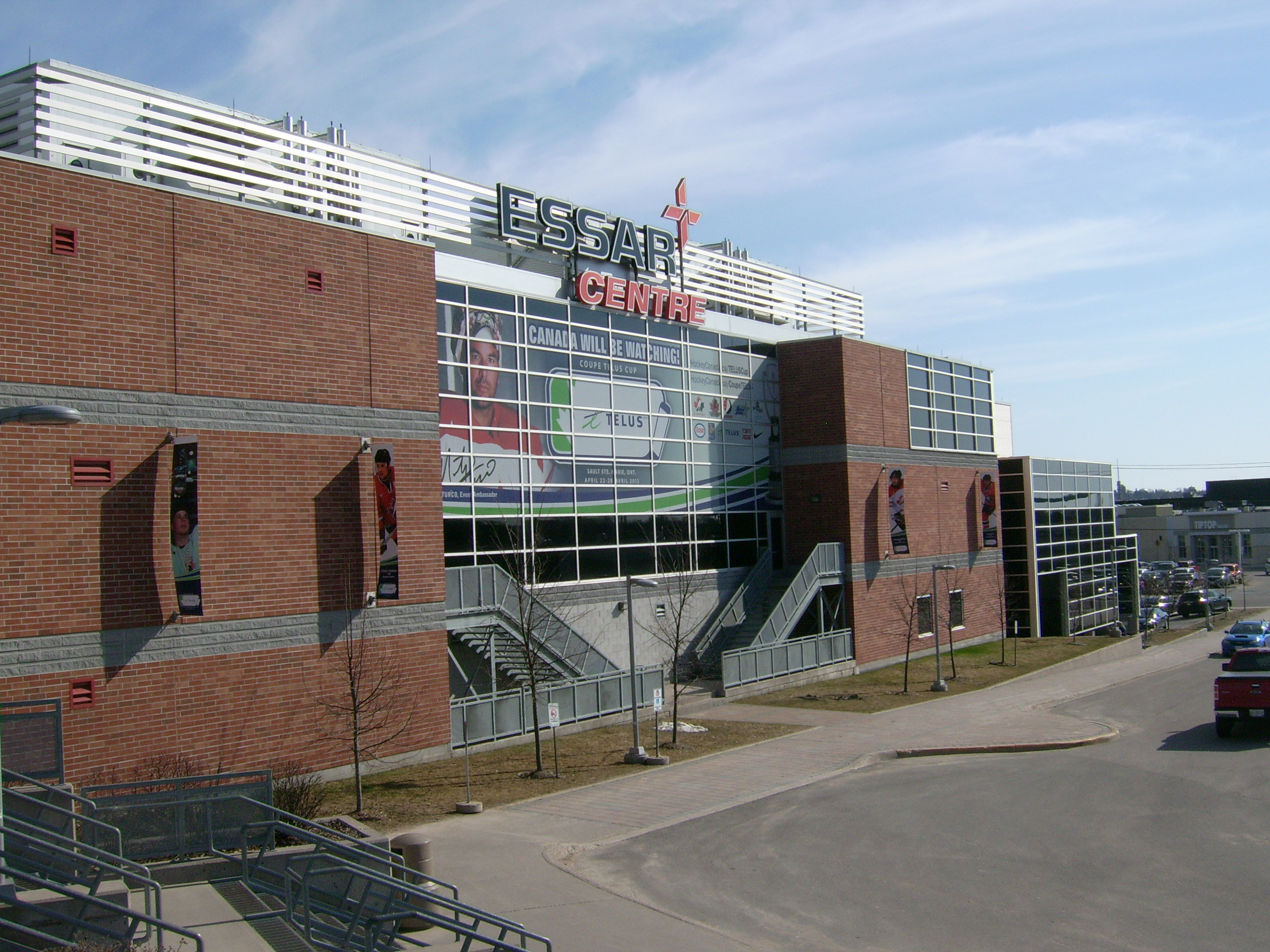
GFL Memorial Gardens, formerly the Steelback Centre and Essar Centre

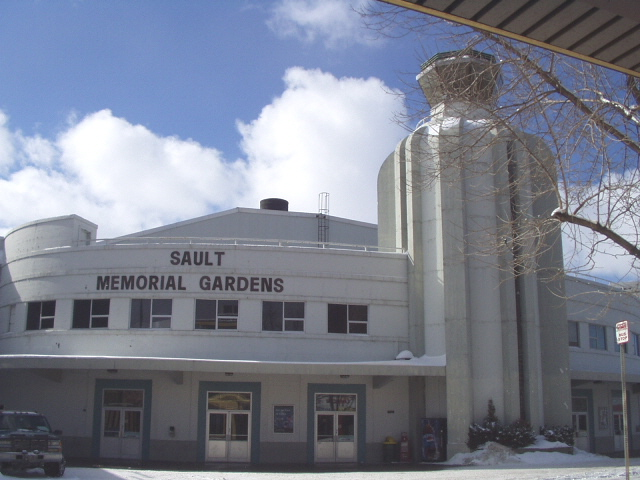
Former Sault Memorial Gardens; the memorial tower now forms part of the new GFL Memorial Gardens.

The Sault Ste. Marie Greyhounds are the city's most recognized sports team having existed since the formation of the Northern Ontario Hockey Association in 1919. The Hounds won national championships twice including the 1993 Memorial Cup and the 1924 Allan Cup. The Greyhounds play in the GFL Memorial Gardens, a state-of-the-art downtown arena that replaced the Sault Memorial Gardens in 2006. The current Hounds have retired seven jerseys since joining the Ontario Hockey League in 1972: #7 Jeff Carter, #19 Joe Thornton, #1 John Vanbiesbrouck, #4 Craig Hartsburg, #10 Ron Francis, #5 Adam Foote, and #99 Wayne Gretzky.

Sault Ste. Marie also had a team in hockey's first professional league. The Sault Ste. Marie Marlboros or 'Canadian Soo' team played in the International Professional Hockey League from 1904 to 1907.

Sault Ste. Marie hockey teams have boasted a number of Hockey Hall of Fame members, including Sault natives or residents Phil Esposito, Tony Esposito, Ron Francis, and Didier Pitre, as well as Sault team members Gerry Cheevers, Paul Coffey, Bill Cook, Bun Cook, Wayne Gretzky, Newsy Lalonde, George McNamara, Joe Thornton, and Marty Walsh.

National Hockey League All-Star Jeff Carter played his entire OHL career as a member of the Greyhounds. Recently retired NHL players from the Sault Ste. Marie area include centre Tyler Kennedy, centre Jordan Nolan, and centre Chris Thorburn. Current NHL players include Ottawa Senators forward Michael Amadio and Winnipeg Jets defenceman Colin Miller.

Sault Ste. Marie native Paul Maurice is the current coach of the NHL's Florida Panthers, leading the team to his and their first Stanley Cup in the 2023-24 season and has otherwise been a head coach for parts of 25 seasons with the Hartford/Carolina franchise, Toronto Maple Leafs, Winnipeg Jets, and the Panthers, becoming the league's youngest ever coach at the age of 28 in 1995, and taking Carolina to the Stanley Cup Finals in 2002. Notably, former Greyhound player and coach Ted Nolan coached parts of 5 seasons in the NHL with the Buffalo Sabres and the New York Islanders, winning the Jack Adams Trophy as the NHL Coach of the Year in 1998 with the Sabres.

Sault Ste. Marie was the host of the 1990 Brier, the Canadian men's curling championship. In 2010, it hosted the Scotties Tournament of Hearts, which serves as Canada's women's curling championship. At the 2013 Tim Hortons Brier held in Edmonton, Alberta, Brad Jacobs and his team from the Soo Curlers Association won the Tim Hortons Brier, and the honour of representing Canada in the 2013 Ford World Men's Curling Championship, where they won silver. The team later won the 2013 Canadian Olympic Curling Trials, earning them the right to represent Canada at the 2014 Winter Olympics, where they won gold. The local curling clubs are the Soo Curlers Association and the Tarentorus Curling Club.

Sault Ste. Marie also has a rich history in Canadian football. For nearly four decades, Sault Ste. Marie high schools have consistently won Northern Ontario honours (NOSSA) and are regular participants in provincial finals. Sault Ste. Marie has also had men's semi-pro football since 1972. The Sault Steelers are 4x National Semi-Pro champions in the Canadian Major Football League, winning the honours in 1972, 2007, 2009, and 2010. The Steelers failed to field a team in the early 1990s before returning for 4 seasons as the Sault Storm, later going back to their original name in the 2000s.

Other notable athletes from Sault Ste. Marie include Canadian Football Hall of Fame inductee Rocky Dipietro, Paralympic swimmer Jessica Tuomela, and mixed martial artist Antonio Carvalho.

The Sault has been host to many national and international sporting events, including the 2003 Eco-Challenge North American Championship, an expedition-length (350–500 km or 220–310 mi) adventure race through unmarked wilderness by biking, trekking, paddling and using ropes.

== Walk of Fame ==
The Walk of Fame was created in 2006 as a joint project between the city of Sault Ste. Marie and its Downtown Association, and honours those from the city or the Algoma District who have made outstanding contributions to the community or significant contributions in their chosen field of work. Inductees are added on an annual basis.

== Culture ==
Sault Ste. Marie is home to the Bon Soo winter carnival, held every February. The city also hosts the annual Algoma Fall Festival which draws local and international performing artists. The Sault Community Theatre and the landmark Central United Church are used for the performances. Both venues hold approximately 1,000 people. The Art Gallery of Algoma features an extensive collection of local and international artists' work and presents regular exhibitions. Residents celebrate Community Day on the third weekend of July. The local Rotary International club organizes a three-day event called Rotaryfest.

Sault Ste. Marie was the focus of Kalle Mattson's "A Love Song to the City", whose music video premiered on USA Today.

Egidio Coccimiglio, a film director who grew up in the city, has shot two films in the Sault Ste. Marie area, Compulsion (2013) and Cascade (2023).

== Notable people ==
- Brigitte Acton, two-time Olympian alpine skier
- Michael Amadio, NHL player for the Ottawa Senators
- David Amber, NHL on Sportsnet reporter and anchor
- Tom Angus, entomologist whose research led to the use of Bacillus thuringiensis as a pest control in forestry and agriculture. Sault Ste. Marie City Council alderman from 1960 to 1991.
- Helen Arvonen, novelist
- Ivan Boldirev, retired NHL centre and 1978 NHL All-Star
- Roberta Bondar, neurologist and the first Canadian female astronaut in space
- Antonio Carvalho, mixed martial artist and UFC veteran
- Treble Charger, Juno Award-nominated alternative rock band
- James W. Curran, publisher and editor of The Sault Star (1901–1952)
- Kerry Diotte, journalist and member of parliament
- Patrick Dovigi, CEO of GFL Environmental
- Kyle Dubas, current general manager of the Pittsburgh Penguins
- David Ellis, Canadian architect
- Phil Esposito, Hockey Hall of Fame inductee, 10th all-time NHL goal scorer, and winner of two Stanley Cups
- Tony Esposito, Hockey Hall of Fame inductee and winner of one Stanley Cup
- Aaron Fiacconi, retired CFL offensive lineman
- Jordan Foisy, comedian and writer for This Hour Has 22 Minutes
- Ron Francis, 5th All-Time leading scorer in the NHL and winner of two Stanley Cups
- Wayne Gretzky, former NHL player and Hall of Famer played for the Soo Greyhounds
- William Howard Hearst, seventh premier of Ontario
- Kevin Hodson, retired NHL goalie and winner of one Stanley Cup and one Memorial Cup
- Brad Jacobs, E. J. Harnden, Ryan Harnden, Canadian curlers, 2014 Winter Olympic gold medalists and 2013 Tim Hortons Brier champions.
- Bill Johnson, Sault Ste. Marie resident unjustly convicted of murder; acquitted in 2007
- David Johnston, 28th Governor General of Canada
- Sharon Johnston, Viceregal Consort to David Johnston and Honorary Captain of the Royal Canadian Navy
- Lila Kedrova, Academy Award winning actress
- James Kelleher, Canadian politician
- Tyler Kennedy, former NHL player
- Tanya Kim, tv personality host
- Keith Knight, film actor
- Jerry Korab, retired defenceman for the National Hockey League from 1971 to 1985
- Chico Maki, former NHL player
- Wayne Maki, former NHL player
- Mac Marcoux, visually-impaired alpine skier and gold medal winner at the 2014 Winter Paralympics
- Kalle Mattson, folk rock musician
- Paul Maurice, current head coach of the NHL's Florida Panthers
- Bob McKenzie, TSN hockey broadcaster and analyst
- William Merrifield, World War I recipient of the Victoria Cross
- Colin Miller, NHL player currently playing for the Winnipeg Jets
- Will Morin, politician and former leader of First Peoples National Party
- Lou Nanne, former NHL player and television analyst
- Jordan Nolan, former NHL player
- Ted Nolan, former NHL player and head coach
- John Parco, retired hockey player and member of the Italian men's hockey team at the 2006 Winter Olympics
- Didier Pitre, Hockey Hall of Fame inductee and winner of one Stanley Cup
- Denis St-Jules, writer and radio broadcaster
- Crystal Shawanda, Juno Award winning country singer
- Lyndon Slewidge, anthem singer for the Ottawa Senators and retired policeman
- Ray Smillie, bronze medal-winning boxer at the 1928 Summer Olympics
- Chris Thorburn, former NHL player
- Jessica Tuomela, visually impaired swimmer and silver medallist at the 2000 Summer Paralympics
- Marty Turco, retired NHL goalie and member of the 2006 Winter Olympics men's hockey team
- Gene Ubriaco, retired NHL player, former AHL coach and coach of the Pittsburgh Penguins and current Senior Advisor/Director of Hockey Operations for the Chicago Wolves of the American Hockey League
- Brian Vallée, author, journalist, filmmaker
- Dennis Vial, retired NHL player who mainly played for the Ottawa Senators
- J. Leonard Walker, president of the Bank of Montreal (1968–1973)
- Jonathan Wilkinson, federal cabinet minister and businessman
- Steve Wochy, former NHL player and the second player in its history to become a Centenarian

== Sister cities ==
- County Louth, Ireland
- Forssa, Finland
- Maia, Portugal
- Sault Ste. Marie, Michigan, United States (also twin city)
