= Bon Soo Winter Carnival =

Coordinates: 46°31′09″N 84°19′09″W

Bon Soo
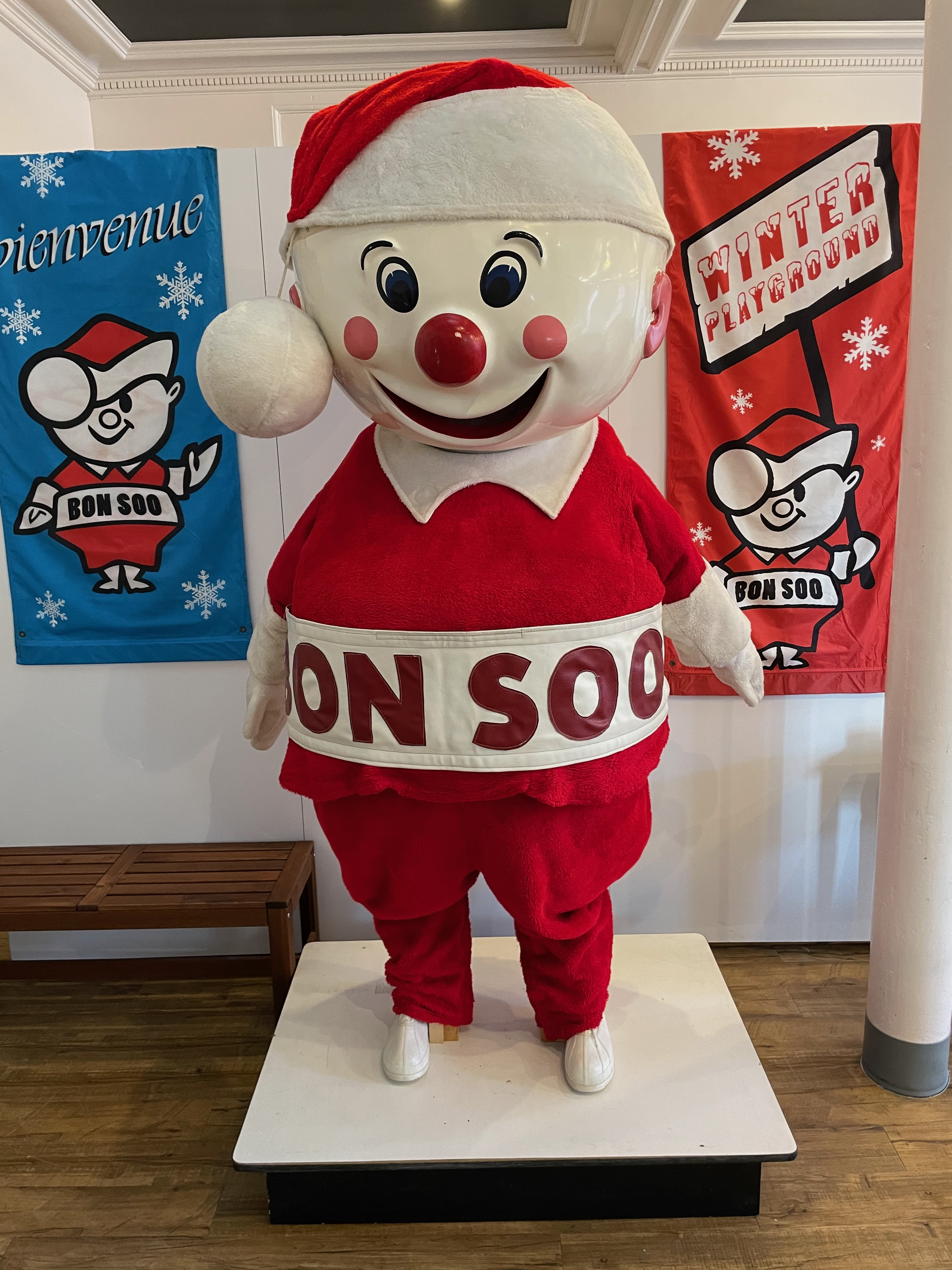
- Mr. Bon Soo statue, Sault Ste. Marie Museum
- Genre: Winter festival
- Begins: Early February
- Ends: Mid February
- Frequency: Annually
- Location: Sault Ste. Marie, Ontario
- Website: www.bonsoo.on.ca

The Bon Soo Winter Carnival is an annual winter carnival in Sault Ste. Marie, Ontario, Canada. The carnival, held every February, began in 1964, and has grown to become one of Ontario's top 50 festivals. The festival features a diverse program of outdoor and indoor sports and activity events, as well as cultural activities including concerts, ice sculptures, and a polar bear swim.

The Bon Soo Winter Carnival is a remnant of French Canadian culture, tracing its roots back to the Montreal Carnivale. The carnival is named after its mascot Bon Soo, created by Ken MacDougall.

== See also ==
- Winter festival
