= Gateway Casinos Sault Ste. Marie =

- Interactive map of Gateway Casinos Sault Ste. Marie
- Location: Sault Ste. Marie, Ontario, Canada; 46.5175°N 84.3435°W
- Opened: 1999
- Gaming space: 35,000 square feet (3,300 m^{2})
- Casino type: Land-based
- Owner: Gateway Casinos
- Website: Official website

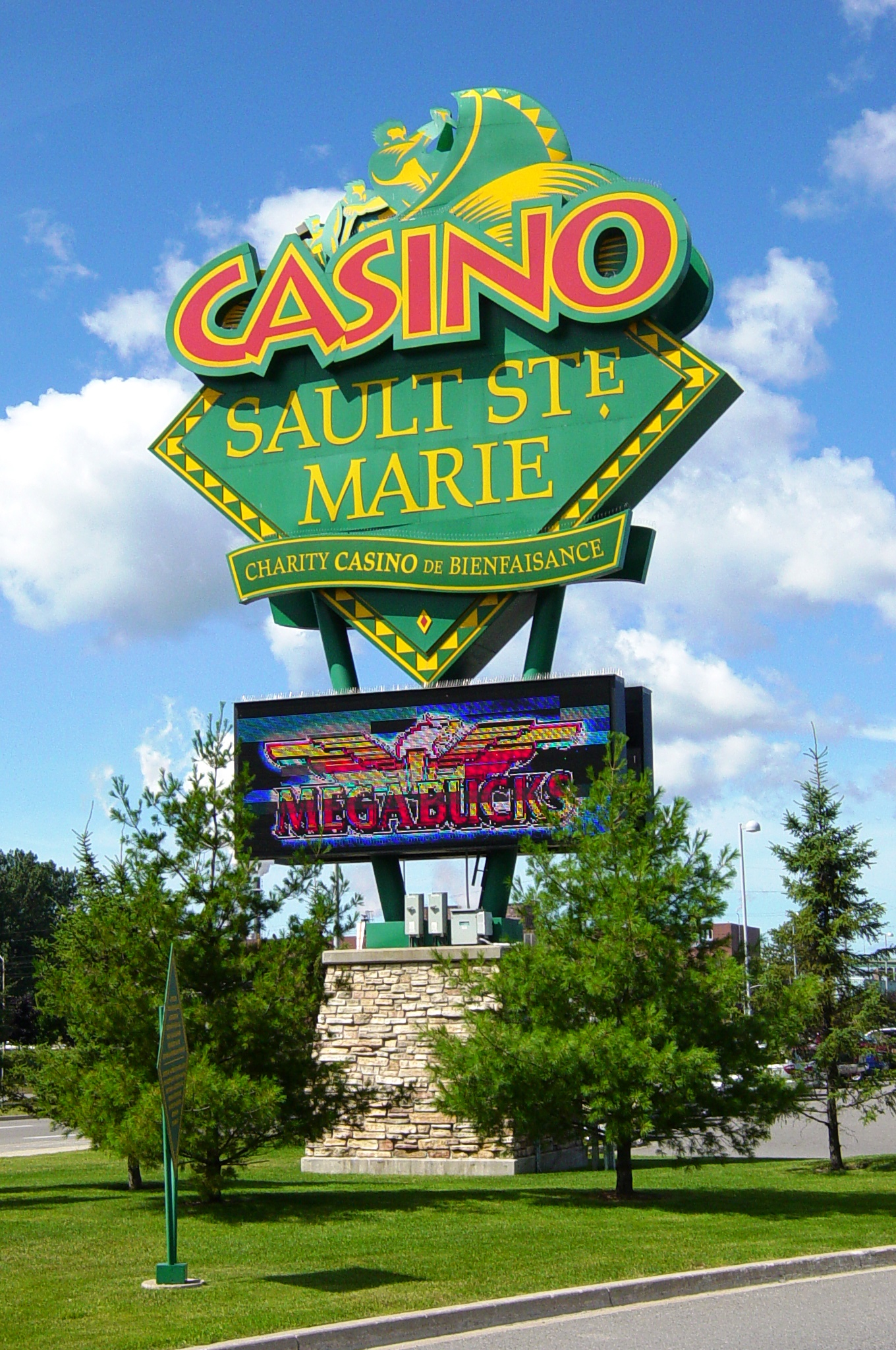
Main entrance sign

Gateway Casinos Sault Ste. Marie (formerly OLG Casino Sault Ste. Marie) is a casino in Sault Ste. Marie, Ontario. Owned an Operated by Burnaby based Gateway Casinos & Entertainment, it was Northern Ontario's first full-time casino when it opened in 1999. The casino is located near the International Bridge which links the city to Sault Ste. Marie, Michigan.

== Facilities ==
Food and beverage facilities offered by the casino include a 100-seat restaurant and a bar. The gaming area is 35,000 square feet (3,300 m^{2}) in size and includes 450 slot machines and 21 game tables. There currently are no accommodations or entertainment facilities on site, making it difficult for the facility to compete with the other casinos in its local market located minutes away in the State of Michigan. The current casino facility has been housed in a temporary movable dome structure since opening in 1999 and has required numerous repairs due to its long-term use. Although the City of Sault Ste. Marie is currently home to the Ontario Lottery and Gaming Corporation, much like its past financial decision to operate two offices, the corporate office based in Toronto currently has no long-term plans for a permanent presence in the Northern Ontario city in the form of any significant investment into any permanent structures.

== Facts and figures ==
- Casino floor size: 35,000-square-foot (3,300 m^{2})
- Slot machines: 360
- Table games: 9
- Restaurants: 1
- Bars: 1

== Drinking age as an attraction ==
The casino derives some of its customers from the United States, in part because the drinking age in Ontario is 19, as opposed to 21 in Michigan.

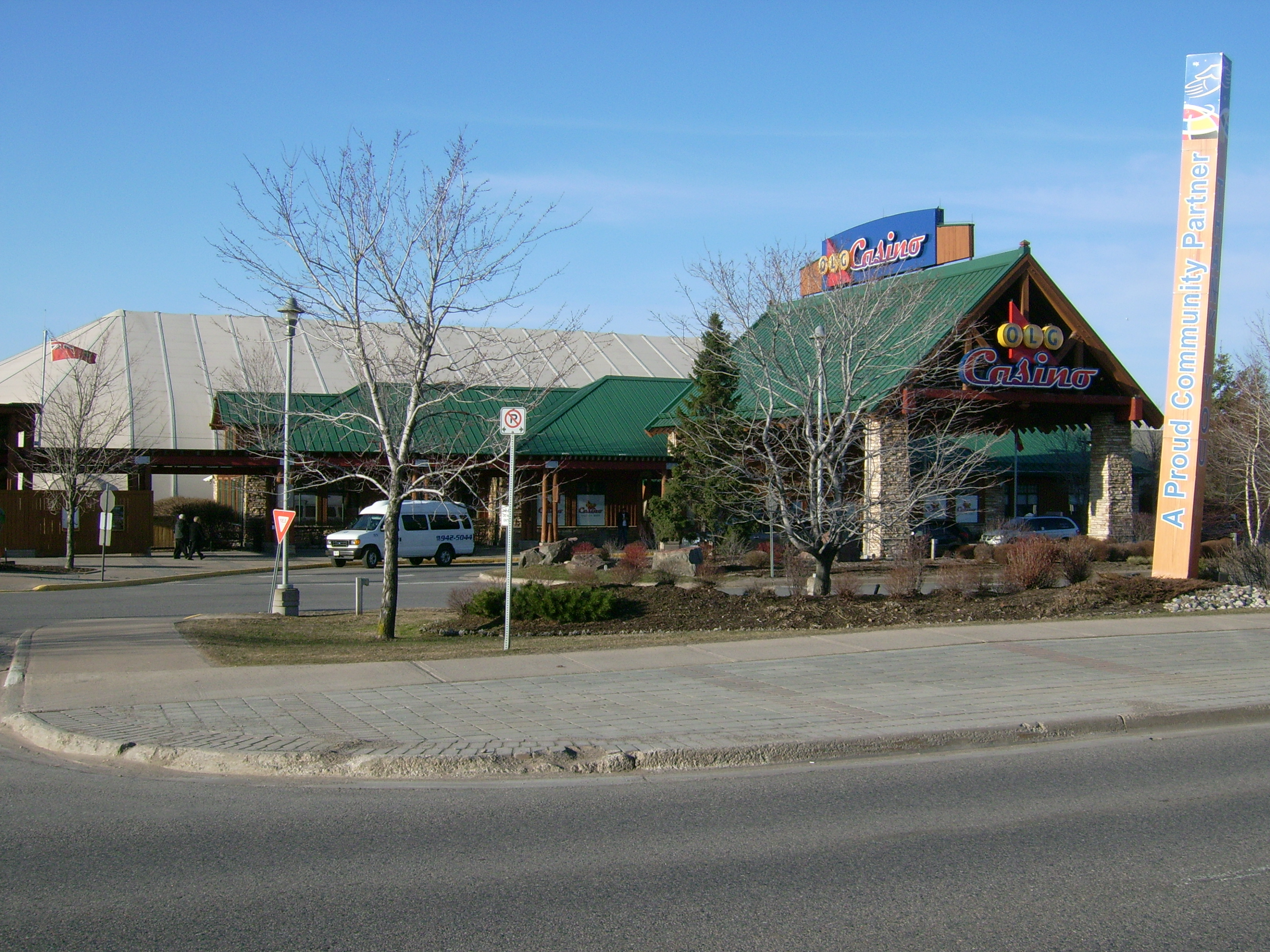
Casino front entrance

== See also ==
- List of casinos in Canada
