= Coat of arms of Sault Ste. Marie, Ontario =

Heraldic symbol of Sault Ste. Marie

- Armiger: Sault Ste. Marie
- Adopted: July 15, 2013
- Crest: The Clergue Block House proper;
- Shield: Azure two chevronels Argent between two square flaunches rompu Or, in chief a whitefish naiant, in base a lily Argent;
- Supporters: Two eastern wolves proper each supporting a hand crucible shafted Or and standing on a mount of pine branches and maple leaves issuant from waves proper;
- Motto: Ojibwe Gchi Gami Odena;
- Designer: Eva Pilar-Cass

The coat of arms of Sault Ste. Marie is the heraldic symbol representing Sault Ste. Marie. The motto is in Ojibway, a fur trading post tops the design to serve as the crest and the shield is held by two timber wolves both of whom are clutching steelworker’s tools.

The Canadian Heraldic Authority created the blazon as well as part of the arms.

== Symbolism ==
The two chevrons pointing upwards evokes the tight passage of the water through the locks. It may also represent the cross section of a steel girder as it resembles said construction tool. The whitefish is a fish species native and seen in grand numbers in the Sault rapids. The lily is a symbol of Sault Ste Marie and makes a reference to French heritage on which the city was built.

The Block House which serves as a crest is a distinctive building as well as one of the oldest in the city.

The timber wolves whom serve as supporters is an animal from the region known for enjoying the company of other people. The crucibles held by long shafts make a reference to the Sault Ste Marie’s steel industry heritage.

The compartment evoke the forest industry and the white-capped waves a reference to the Sault rapids. The maples leaves represent the city as a Canadian one and the gold colour which they have makes allude those seen in the coat of arms of Ontario.

The Ojibwe phrase Ojibwe Gchi Gami Odena is the one which appeared on the original coat of arms. Experts in the language confirmed in meant: settlement near the Ojibwe's big lake. With this motto, Sault Ste Marie has become the first city to have a motto in Ojibwe.

== Blazon ==
Arms: Azure two chevronels Argent between two square flaunches rompu Or, in chief a whitefish naiant, in base a lily Argent;

Crest: The Clergue Block House proper;

Supporters: Two eastern wolves proper each supporting a hand crucible shafted Or and standing on a mount of pine branches and maple leaves issuant from waves proper;

== Former coat of arms ==
The arms were adopted unofficially in 1912. The two people, who serve as supporters were referred to as a steelworker or lock keeper and a native Canadian, along with the crown, did not meet Heraldic Authority standards. The beaver, trees, and wording did meet the criteria. The existing three-part shield included a canal and locks, a railway and trees with the Ojibwe motto “Ojibwa Kitche Gumeeng Odena” meaning “Ojibway town next to a big body of water.”
