= Survive This season 1 =

Survive This
- Season 1
- No. of episodes: 7

Release
- Original network: YTV
- Original release: April 7 – June 30, 2009

Season chronology
- Next → Season 2

This is a list of episodes for the first season of Survive This, a Canadian reality TV show on which eight teenagers with limited survival skills training are taken into a forest and confronted with a number of survival challenges to test their skills and perseverance. The show is hosted by Les Stroud, who narrates each episode, provides the teens with survival challenges, and assesses their performance. The show premiered on April 7, 2009, in Canada and on June 17, 2009, in the United States. Cartoon Network ceased airing Survive This after August 19, 2009; the last episode to air was "Mountain." The final three episodes screened only on the Cartoon Network website.

== Participants ==
Eight teenagers were given a week's survival training before being taken into the wilderness. The Season One cast included:

- Adam—Adam Deganis is a 15-year-old native of Mississauga, Ontario, who attends Loyola Catholic Secondary School. Labeled as "the sportsman" on the series, his survival experiences consisted of hunting, fishing, and spending summers at his family vacation home. A fan of Survivorman, he applied to be on the series because he wanted to meet Les Stroud. Deganis is an arachnophobe.
- Becca—Becca Mehaffey is a 17-year-old from Markham, Ontario, who has almost no outdoors experience. Her friends and family laughed at her when she applied to be on the show. She was called "the princess" on the show, and practices dance in her spare time.
- Becky—Becky Tran is a 17-year-old from Newmarket, Ontario, who was labeled "the environmentalist" on the series, but whom the other participants called "BT." Tran, who is admittedly "addicted" to her hair iron, was frightened of dirt, germs, and insects.
- Catarina—Catarina is a 17-year-old who was described as "the tough girl" on the series.
- Holden—Holden Adams is a 16-year-old who was called "the city boy" on the show. After the show ended, he admitted that lack of sleep, hunger, and physical exhaustion often led him to rest while others did the work of finding food and building shelter.
- Jen—Jennifer Daub is a 16-year-old resident of Blind River, Ontario. She attends W. C. Eaket Secondary School. She was labeled "the hunter" on the series because she had spent time tracking and hunting deer with her father, and was an expert rifleman, all-terrain vehicle driver, and camper. One of her older brothers learned about the show and encouraged her to apply. She applied online by sending in a photo of herself with a deer she had shot and killed, and had a telephone interview and video interview before being picked for the show. She was often frustrated by having to help other participants who had little outdoors experience.
- Kareem—Kareem Ali is a 17-year-old native of Toronto, Ontario, Canada. Given the label of "the motivator" by the producers, he was seen as more competitive than the others. He attends Bloor Collegiate Institute.
- Zac—Zac Siegel is a 14-year-old resident of Thornhill, Ontario, who attends Westmount Collegiate Institute. He applied to be on the show through a survival camp he was already enrolled at. He had extensive wilderness survival skills before he joined the show, has a photographic memory, and a high-level intelligence. He was extremely frustrated on the show because the other participants had so little wilderness survival skill. "In many cases I had to teach people to start a fire or build a proper shelter, collect berries, basically I spent a lot of time with those who didn't have a clue what Les was talking about," he told the press. Labeled as "the camp counselor" by the producers, the others perceived him as an overachiever.

== Episodes ==
No.	Title	Original release date	US release date
1	"Impact"	April 7, 2009	June 17, 2009
Eight teens are sent out into the wilderness from Survival School to face their first challenge: To survive a bus crash in an isolated forest. They must now work together to salvage what they can from the wrecked bus, build shelters, make a fire, and boil water to drink.
2	"Shelter"	April 14, 2009	June 24, 2009
As punishment for placing their food in an unsafe location, Les Stroud takes away some of the group's rations. The girls and boys compete to see who can create the better shelter. Catarina suffers from heat stroke, and Zac catches frogs for dinner.
3	"Food"	April 21, 2009	July 1, 2009
The group splits up into pairs to find food: Zac and Catarina hunt for frogs, Kareem and Holden fish, Adam and Jen search for edible plants, and Becca and Becky hunt for edible insects. Les takes away the group's fire-starting materials, and the fire must be kept going despite rain. Laziness sets in. Adam catches and kills a pheasant, but accidentally cuts his leg with a knife and suffers a deep cut.
4	"Navigation"	April 28, 2009	July 8, 2009
Les Stroud rousts the group from their beds at night, and sends them on a night hike armed with nothing but a GPS device and a set of geographical coordinates. Becky leaves the show.
5	"Rafting Accident"	May 5, 2009	July 15, 2009
Les sends the group down a river on a whitewater rafting challenge, but the inflatable boat is punctured on a sharp stick and sinks. Les meets the group and orders them to the other side of the river without food or sleeping gear. They must avoid injury, make a fire, prevent hypothermia, and stay out of the poison ivy.
6	"Deep Woods, Part I"	May 12, 2009	July 22, 2009
The group is split into two teams—Team 1 (those with strong survival skills: Adam, Jen, and Zac) and Team 2 (those with weak survival skills: Becca, Catarina, Holden, and Kareem)—and each is left in the deep woods. They must find food, shelter, and water, and make a fire. Adam kills a porcupine, Jen makes fire, and Team 1 builds a shelter and locates water. The other team fails in everything, and gives up. Kareem tries to build a shelter, but falls ill and a paramedic assists him. Kareem's illness worsens as the episode ends.
7	"Deep Woods, Part II"	May 19, 2009	July 29, 2009
Kareem, suffering from exhaustion, is declared fit to continue by the parademic. The next morning, Team 1 makes a breakfast of flour and water cooked over a fire. Team 2 goes hungry. The two teams are told to hike east, forcing them to navigate around lakes and across a swamp—navigating by using the sun and a watch. Team 1 heads east but goes the long way around a lake, that a five-hour hike becomes a 10-hour hike. They meet Les Stroud at their destination. Team 2 becomes lost, but finds sphagnum moss and squeezes water from it. The Team 2 members quarrel with one another, and by nightfall end up almost where they started from. Becca, Catarina, and Holden leave the show.
8	"Swamp"	May 26, 2009	August 5, 2009
Adam, Jen, Kareem, and Zac canoe across a swamp to an abandoned beaver lodge. Catarina returns to the show. Forced to abandon their canoes and with limited supplies (including plastic garbage bags, a magnesium fire-starter, and a teakettle), the five must swim and walk across the swamp to a marshy area, build a shelter on the water, find food and water, and spend the night on the water. Catarina has an emotional breakdown after crossing the swamp; Kareem and Zac try to calm her while Adam and Jen build the sleeping platform on the water. The five walk and swim across the swamp to reach dry land again. Catarina leaves the show once more.
9	"Rocky Terrain"	June 2, 2009	August 12, 2009
Les Stroud tells Jen she must pretend to have one broken leg, and Adam must pretend to have two broken legs. Adam and Jen are separated, forcing Zac to care for Jen and Kareem to take care for Adam. The team must stay one night in bear territory. Jen and Zac must build a signal fire which can be seen from the air, and light it in time for a rescue helicopter to see it. Jen and Zac become friends, while Kareem struggles to provide food and water for Adam.
10	"Mountain"	June 9, 2009	August 19, 2009
Adam, Jen, Kareem, and Zac must scale a vertical cliff face using climbing gear. The team are given one match, some pemmican, and a harmonica and told to build a fire, find water, and make a shelter. Adam and Jen collect firewood and complain that Kareem and Zac aren't pulling their weight. Kareem and Zac have difficulty finding water, and Zac successfully lights the fire. The next morning, all four rappell back down the cliff. Les is critical of the failure to build a shelter, and how Adam and Jen turned survival into a competition.
11	"Island Castaways"	June 16, 2009	TBA
Adam, Jen, Kareem, and Zac are given few supplies and forced to swim to an isolated island in the middle of Lake Huron. They experience difficulty building a fire on the windswept island, worry about when Les might return, and build a lean-to the following day. Adam spots an abandoned canoe on a nearby island, swims to retrieve it, and finds it is too rotten to use. Jen criticizes the building of the shelter. Zac spots a passing ship, but they are unable to catch its attention. The teens catch some crayfish, and Jen criticizes Kareem and Zac's fishing abilities. Morale drops, Adam and Zac build a signal fire, Kareem starts to fall ill, and Jen criticizes how much Kareem is sleeping. The signal fire draws the attention of a boat, which Les is piloting. Les tells the four teens that their next mission is a solo one. No one drops out.
12	"Solo Missions"	June 23, 2009	TBA
The first of a two-part episode. Les assesses the strengths and weaknesses of each of the four remaining teens. He gives each teen a survival sack and warns them they may be in the wilderness for days. Each surviving teen is taken to a different spot. Jen is taken to a swamp (because she dislikes damp and has poor fire-starting skills), and is given mesh netting. Zac is taken into the deep woods (where he exhibited the poorest self-initiative), and is also given a snare wire. Kareem is taken to the top of a rocky outcrop (which tested him the most previously), and given two garbage bags. Adam is taken to an island (where the cold almost made him break down), and is given fishing line and hook. Adam and Kareem reconnoiter their area; Jen and Zac don't. Adam finds food, builds a shelter, and starts a fire easily. The next day, he finds a fishing lure in the water, catches fish to eat, and finds rock tripe and plantain leaves to eat. Kareem also finds rock tripe to eat and starts a fire (although it takes him an hour), but neglects to build a shelter or bear-proof his camp. Kareem finds water, but forgets to bring anything to filter it with and expends a lot of calories retrieving his bandana. He begins to suffer from dehydration and starvation, and eats paper. Zac builds a shelter and a fire, but later realizes there was a better site. He moves his campsite, expending a lot of calories. Plastic bins he finds prove useless. Zac locates water, but finds only wintergreen leaves to chew. Jen realizes too late that her camp site is not the best, takes more than three hours to get a fire going, and spends most of the second day unsuccessfully trying to catch frogs. She gets wet and depressed, and pines for Adam.
13	"Search and Rescue Finale"	June 30, 2009	TBA
The second of a two-part episode, and an hour-long episode. During the first 15 minutes of the episode, Les reviews the season's developments. Becca, Becky, Catarina, and Holden as well as the surviving four teens' families assemble to welcome Adam, Jen, Kareem, and Zac home. Each surviving teen's situation is assessed after three days in the wilderness. Only Adam has eaten a substantial amount of food (he caught a smallmouth bass), while the others are depressed, hungry, tired, and not doing much work. The teens spend a third day in the woods. Rescue workers search for the teens. Zac doesn't make a signal fire, delaying his rescue. Jen injures her foot, but regains her sense of purpose. Adam moves his camp to the open shoreline. Jen is rescued first (by ground searchers), and Zac is found soon after by a search and rescue dog team. Kareem's despair at not being rescued leads him to stop seeking food and ignore his signal fire. Adam is rescued late on the third day after his smoke signal draws a rescue boat. Kareem is rescued at the very end of the day by a search and rescue helicopter after finally lighting his signal fire. Each teen has an emotional reunion with their family.

=== Episode 7 ===
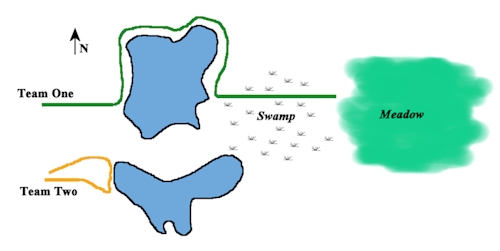
Map of the course taken by Team One and Team Two during Episode 7, "Deep Woods, Part 2."

In the seventh episode, "Deep Woods, Part 2", both teams started out at relatively the same spot (see map, right). Each team was told to head east, pass through the swamp, and arrive in the meadow. Neither team was told that a lake lay in their path. The shortest course for each team would be to pass between the lakes. Team One navigated east correctly, but then took the long way (north) around the lake. Their five-hour hike turned into a 10-hour trek. Team One arrived at the meadow, however. Team Two's navigation was errant, and the team traveled east for only a short time before drifting east-southeast. When Team Two reached the lake, they became lost and turned north when they thought they was going south. Team Two then mistakenly doubled back to its starting point and never made it to the meadow.
