= List of Survivorman episodes =

Survivorman is a Canadian-produced television program, broadcast in Canada on the Outdoor Life Network (OLN), and internationally on Discovery Channel and Science Channel. The television series Survivorman consists of 8 seasons with a total of 51 episodes and 9 specials. The show originally aired on the Outdoor Life Network. It's unclear whether the dates of airing listed below are the Canadian or American dates or a mix depending on the season. The show debuted in Canada in 2004.

Season 6, which premiered in the US on 1 April 2015, is a break from the traditional series scenarios. It's focused on finding the mythical creature known as Bigfoot, rather than on outdoor survival odysseys as the name would otherwise imply.

Season 7 of Survivorman, which returned to the traditional format of lone survivor scenarios, premiered in the US on 7 November 2015, 10/9c PM.

== Series overview ==
Series	Episodes	Originally released	
Series	Episodes	First released	Last released
1	10	6 April 2005	8 June 2005
2	7	10 August 2007	21 September 2007
3	6	7 November 2008	19 December 2008
4	4	30 June 2012	21 July 2012
5	8	1 January 2014	26 March 2014
6	7	1 April 2015	13 May 2015
7	7	7 November 2015	19 December 2015
8	4	19 June 2016	2016
Specials	9	16 September 2012	12 February 2014

== Episodes ==
=== Season 1 (2005) ===
No. overall	No. in season	Title	Original release date
1	1	"Canadian Boreal Forest"	6 April 2005
Les Stroud simulates becoming stranded after a canoeing accident in a Northern Ontario forest.
2	2	"Arizona Desert"	13 April 2005
A broken down dirt bike provides the scenario for surviving in Arizona's Sonoran Desert.
3	3	"Costa Rica"	20 April 2005
Marooned on Costa Rica's Osa Peninsula, Les must survive on a tropical beach and in dense jungle.
4	4	"Georgia Swamp"	27 April 2005
Les is stranded in the swamplands of Georgia's Altamaha River Basin.
5	5	"Canadian Arctic"	4 May 2005
Les must survive after his snowmobile breaks down in the Canadian Arctic, near Pond Inlet.
6	6	"Mountain"	11 May 2005
Hiking gone wrong leads to a week in the Canadian Rockies.
7	7	"Canyonlands"	18 May 2005
A broken bicycle strands Les in the Utah canyons.
8	8	"Plane Crash"	25 May 2005
Les simulates survival as a plane crash survivor in Temagami, Ontario in the winter, simulating a broken arm.
9	9	"Lost at Sea"	1 June 2005
Les must survive on a raft in the middle of the ocean near Belize for several days in temperatures of 102 °F (39 °C), then washes ashore on an uninhabited island.
10	10	"Behind the Scenes"	8 June 2005
Les presents clips and outtakes from the previous nine survival episodes.

=== Season 2 (2007) ===
No. overall	No. in season	Title	Original release date
11	1	"Kalahari"	10 August 2007
Les' 4x4 runs out of gas, leaving him to survive extreme heat in the Kalahari Desert.
12	2	"Amazon"	17 August 2007
Les pays a visit to one of the densest, deepest parts of the Amazon rainforest.
13	3	"Labrador"	24 August 2007
Les is paired with a team of sled dogs as he travels along the Labrador coast.
14	4	"African Plains"	31 August 2007
Les lands his hot air balloon in the Northern part of South Africa.
15	5	"Alaska"	7 September 2007
Les kayaks into a remote Alaskan bay.
16	6	"South Pacific"	14 September 2007
Les is shipwrecked on a small atoll (Aitutaki) in the Cook Islands.
17	7	"Behind the Scenes"	21 September 2007
Les explains his preparation for each locale in this behind the scenes look at the episodes of season 2.

=== Season 3 (2008) ===
No. overall	No. in season	Title	Original release date
18	1	"Sierra Nevada"	7 November 2008
Les plays the role of a backpacker in California's Sierra Nevada mountains and challenges search and rescue teams to find him.
19	2	"Colorado Rockies"	14 November 2008
Les survives in Colorado's Rocky Mountains accompanied by two horses.
20	3	"Arctic Tundra"	21 November 2008
Les goes north to the Arctic Baffin Island equipped as a researcher with some advanced survival gear.
21	4	"Temagami Hunting (Deep Woods)"	5 December 2008
Les Stroud is joined by his friend Bob Wilson as they simulate being hunters lost in the forests of Temagami, Ontario.
22	5	"Australian Outback"	12 December 2008
After his ultralight airplane runs out of fuel, Les Stroud is stranded in the Australian Outback.
23	6	"Papua New Guinea"	19 December 2008
Les is stranded in Hewa territory in the Papua New Guinea jungle and left to survive alone.

=== Season 4 (2012) ===
Part of Survivorman 10 Days. This season is officially considered to be the fourth season of the show in the United States, despite airing on the Science Channel.

No. overall	No. in season	Title	Original release date
24	1	"Norway Mountain – Part 1"	30 June 2012
Les visits the mountains of Norway, where he has to survive for 10 days. Once his car runs out of gas, Les is forced to live off of the supplies available in the car before heading out towards more hospitable areas.
25	2	"Norway Mountain – Part 2"	7 July 2012
Continuation of previous episode. Les finds a cabin and some food, before heading out towards the coast.
26	3	"Tiburón Island Coast – Part 1"	14 July 2012
Les must survive for 10 days on a Mexican desert island. Stuck offshore on an abandoned sailboat, he survives on the water before relocating to the shore.
27	4	"Tiburón Island Coast – Part 2"	21 July 2012
Continuation of previous episode. Les journeys into the arid desert interior and finishes his 10 days in the deep desert before hiking out.

=== Season 5 (2014) ===
A new eight episode season of Survivorman was ordered for Travel + Escape in Canada, and either Discovery Channel or Science Channel in the United States. Two episodes feature Les' son, Logan, and the season is accompanied by two specials, Survivorman & Son and Survivorman Stalking Sasquatch on the Science Channel.

No. overall	No. in season	Title	Original release date
28	1	"Grenada Jungle"	1 January 2014
Les must survive for 5 days in the jungle on the island of Grenada
29	2	"Frigate Island"	8 January 2014
Les must survive for 5 days on Frigate Island in the Grenadines
30	3	"Tierra del Fuego"	15 January 2014
Les Stroud travels to the Mitre Peninsula, a remote peninsula located on the easternmost tip of Isla Grande in the province of Tierra del Fuego, Argentina.
31	4	"Temagami Forest"	29 January 2014
Les Stroud travels into the forests of Ontario's Temagami, and the oldest mountains in North America to survive for 5 days, with no food, no water, no shelter, and no crew. Although it's his third time in Temagami, he still is challenged by the wilderness.
32	5	"Survivorman and Son: Tofino"	5 March 2014
Les Stroud and his teenaged son Logan find themselves stranded for 5 days off the coast of Vancouver Island during a kayaking trip with little supplies and no camera crew.
33	6	"Survivorman and Son: Northern Ontario"	12 March 2014
Les and Logan take on the role of two fisherman stranded in Wabakimi Provincial Park after the boat motor breaks down. All they have to survive with is their boat, fishing gear and no camera crew.
34	7	"Survivorman Bigfoot: Nordegg"	19 March 2014
Les travels to the Rocky Mountains in West Central Alberta to look for evidence in the existence of the elusive creature Bigfoot
35	8	"Survivorman Bigfoot: Radium Springs"	26 March 2014
Les treads into the wilderness of British Columbia, another alleged site for Sasquatch sightings

=== Season 6 (2015) ===
A new seven episode season of Survivorman has been ordered for Discovery Channel or Science Channel in the United States, and OLN in Canada.

No. overall	No. in season	Title	Original release date
36	1	"Survivorman Bigfoot: Legend of Klemtu Hill"	1 April 2015 (US), 8 April 2015 (Canada)
Les heads to a volcano in British Columbia to investigate reports of Bigfoot sightings.
37	2	"Survivorman Bigfoot: Where the Myth Began"	8 April 2015 (US), 15 April 2015 (Canada)
Les risks a run in with black bears while investigating the woods of Northern California looking for evidence of a Sasquatch.
38	3	"Survivorman Bigfoot: Mystery of Bigfoot Mountain"	15 April 2015 (US)
Les explores the Rocky Mountains in Canada looking for proof of a Bigfoot in the area.
39	4	"Survivorman Bigfoot: Giants of the Forest"	22 April 2015 (US)
Les brings infrared equipment to Alberta as he searches for a Sasquatch.
40	5	"Survivorman Bigfoot: Smoky Mountain Sasquatch"	29 April 2015 (US)
Les treks through the Great Smoky Mountains in Tennessee following reports of Bigfoot sightings near an area where black bears can also be found.
41	6	"Survivorman Bigfoot: Searching the Southwest"	6 May 2015 (US)
Les follows local reports of a Sasquatch spotted along a southern trail that leads from Texas to Utah.
42	7	"Survivorman Bigfoot: The Hidden World of Bigfoot"	13 May 2015 (US)
Les visits different forests across North America in search of Sasquatch, returning to a legendary Bigfoot hotspot in the Canadian wild.

=== Season 7 (2015) ===
The season began on 7 November 2015 and aired on Discovery Channel and Science Channel in the United States, and Outdoor Life Network in Canada.

No. overall	No. in season	Title	Original release date
43	1	"Fan Challenge"	7 November 2015 (US)
Les teaches the winner of a fan submission contest, amateur filmmaker Joseph McConnell, about wilderness survival in the remote Ontario wilderness.
44	2	"Transylvania Part 1"	14 November 2015 (US)
Les Stroud disappears into the thickly forested Transylvanian Alps to test the skills of Romania's top search and rescue team, and himself.
45	3	"Transylvania Part 2"	21 November 2015 (US)
Les simulates a broken leg so that a Romanian search and rescue team will locate him in the Transylvania mountains.
46	4	"Oregon"	28 November 2015 (US)
The story of a family that was lost in the forests of Oregon for six days.
47	5	"India (The Himalayan Foothills)"	5 December 2015 (US)
Les travels to Northern India in the foothills of the Himalayans to survive in an area with the world's reported densest tiger population.
48	6	"Tonga"	12 December 2015 (US)
Les and his friend Bob Wilson are stranded on a deserted island in the archipelago country of Tonga.
49	7	"Patagonia"	19 December 2015 (US)
Les retraces the last steps of experienced Argentine hiker Laureano Emanuel Santos on the circuit track of Torres del Paine National Park in Chilean Patagonia to investigate how tragedies can occur even on well-traveled wilderness trails.

=== Season 8 (2016) ===
No. overall	No. in season	Title	Original release date
50	1	"Survivorman and Son: TOFINO"	2016 (US)
Les and his 16-year-old son Logan find themselves trapped without supplies and without a way home while sea kayaking along the coastline of British Columbia. Staying hydrated, fed and warm takes on a whole new meaning with Logan by his side. Lack of food, unsafe water and inclement weather can wreak havoc on the body – let alone one’s mood. Logan’s better at video games than survival and better at hockey than starting a fire. Distraction can cause mistakes…and mistakes can be very costly.
51	2	"Survivorman and Son: WABAKIMI"	2016 (US)
Les and Logan set out for a father/son fishing trip in a tin boat. Stranded after their motor dies, Les and Logan are quickly plunged into an intense survival situation that could happen to any summer cottager. This father/son team must work together to stay hydrated, secure food, make shelter and flag down a rescue plane. Les gets creative using bug spray as a fire-starter. Father/son dynamics effect their decision-making.
52	3	"Survivorman and Son: ECUADOR"	2016 (US)
Father and son embark on a photography expedition deep in the Ecuadorian jungle but when the tour guide doesn’t return, Les and Logan must put their wills of survival to the ultimate test…
53	4	"Survivorman and Son: MONGOLIA"	2016 (US)
Les returns to Mongolia after surviving a near-fatal car crash the year before with his son Logan, a recent cancer survivor.

=== Specials ===
No.	Title	Original release date
1	"Survivorman's Top Ten"	16 September 2012
2	"Survivorman’s Secrets of Survival - Fire"	6 September 2013
3	"Survivorman’s Secrets of Survival - Shelters"	13 September 2013
4	"Survivorman’s Secrets of Survival - Water"	20 September 2013
5	"Survivorman’s Secrets of Survival - Food"	27 September 2013
6	"Survivorman’s Secrets of Survival - McGyverisms"	11 October 2013
7	"Survivorman’s Secrets of Survival - Dangers"	18 October 2013
8	"Survivorman's Lost Pilots - Summer"	5 February 2014
Filmed in the summer of 2001.
9	"Survivorman's Lost Pilots - Winter"	12 February 2014
Filmed in January 2002.
