= Beyond Survival (TV series) =

2010 Canadian documentary television show

- Genre: Documentary
- Created by: Les Stroud
- Starring: Les Stroud
- Narrated by: Les Stroud
- Country of origin: Canada
- Original language: English

Production
- Running time: 44 minutes (not including commercials)

Original release
- Network: OLN; Discovery Channel
- Release: August 27 – October 29, 2010

Beyond Survival is a Canadian documentary television show hosted by survival expert Les Stroud.

== Episodes ==
Episode	Title	Date
1	The Devil Dancers of Sri Lanka	August 27, 2010
2	The Sea Gypsies of Malaysia	September 3, 2010
3	The San - Bushmen of the Kalahari	September 10, 2010
4	The Hewa and the Hidden Secret Ceremony	September 17, 2010
5	Madagascar - The Seed Ceremony	September 24, 2010
6	The Inuit - Survivors of the Future	October 1, 2010
7	Peru - The Huacharia of the Amazon	October 8, 2010
8	The Zulus of South Africa	October 15, 2010
9	The Q'ero - Descendants of the Incan High Priests	October 22, 2010
10	The Mentawai Shamans of Indonesia	October 29, 2010

== See also ==
- Survivorman, TV series starring Les Stroud
- Survive This, TV series hosted by Les Stroud
