= Survive This season 2 =

Survive This
- Season 2
- No. of episodes: 13

Release
- Original network: YTV
- Original release: April 19 – July 12, 2010

Season chronology
- ← Previous; Season 1

This is a list of episodes for the second and final season of Survive This, a Canadian reality TV show on which eight teenagers with limited survival skills training are taken into a forest and confronted with a number of survival challenges to test their skills and perseverance. The show is hosted by Les Stroud, who narrates each episode, provides the teens with survival challenges, and assesses their performance.

The second season premiered on April 19, 2010, on YTV.

== Participants ==
Participants were selected for the show, in part, based on their strong personalities. All the participants were required to take a three-day survival program with David Arama, a wilderness survival expert and close friend of Les Stroud's. Training including how to build a shelter, fire-starting, edible plants, and using a compass. The season two cast included:

- Colin—Colin is a 15-year-old from Hamilton, Ontario. He believes that a balance between school and friends is important. He was named "Ultimate Survivor" by Les Stroud.
- Ian—Ian McBain is a 14-year-old from Ajax, Ontario. Interested in animals and the outdoors and seeking a career as a biologist, McBain was inspired to audition for the second season after seeing the first season episode Swamp: "The episode from the first season that really motivated me to try to get on the show was the swamp episode. "Most people would think 'Oh gross. a swamp, there's leaches and stuff.' That was the turning point for me, I was like 'I have to get on this show, that looks so fun, so many different experiences.'" McBain, who admits to being an unadventurous "wimp", says that he learned to trust other people and believe in himself during the show. For him, the toughest part of the series was getting through the nights and worrying about wild animal attacks.
- Jade—Jade is a 13-year-old girl from Ancaster, Ontario. She was raised on a farm.
- Justin—Justin Cutajar is a 16-year-old from Mississauga, Ontario. He had auditioned for the first season but did not make the cut. He auditioned for the second season because he still wanted to see how far he could push himself. He says being on the show was "a life-altering experience." The hardest part, for him, was the lack of food; he lost 12 pounds (5.4 kg) while filming the series. Back at home after the show, he says he never leaves food on his plate and reminds himself every day of how he has a bed to sleep in and home to live in. He cites patience, emotional strength, the will to live, and physical strength as the things which allowed him to get through the show.
- Manaal—Manaal Ismacil is a 16-year-old from St. Catharines, Ontario. Her mother is a Somalian who is a refugee from Somalia. Manaal was born in Kenya, but her family emigrated to the United States when she was seven years old and to Canada four years later. She attends Sir Winston Churchill Secondary School, loves to read and study, and has never been camping. She had not seen the first season, but applied after being urged to do so by her younger sister (who had). She is interested in International relations, and wants a career as a human rights lawyer. She is a volunteer in many groups, including her school, the St. Catharines mayor's council, and Save the Children Canada.
- Michael—Michael Lattouf is a 17-year-old from Brampton, Ontario, who attends Notre Dame Catholic Secondary School and wants to be an actor. He had no survival skills prior to appearing on the show. He says that he felt overwhelmed at first. The producers and Les Stroud "just threw us right in, and it was non-stop," and he felt the lack of food was the most challenging aspect of the show. He also felt that having eight teenagers on the show made for a lot of emotion. Lattouf says the show was very challenging, and he learned a great deal from it. "People live like this every day—homeless people, or people in poor countries—and it made me understand their struggles more."
- Nicole—Nicole Ponce is a 14-year-old who is heavily involved in school athletics.
- Patricia—Patricia Robins is a 16-year-old from Niagara Falls, Ontario, who is somewhat socially rebellious. She attends Stamford Collegiate Secondary School. She applied to be on the show without having seen the first season. She believed that only actors were admitted to the show, and felt that this would be a boost to her acting career. After seeing the first season, she resolved to turn down the show if offered a chance to compete and then later changes her mind. Labeled as "the rebel" on the show, she says she is more of a diva.

== Episodes ==
No.	Title	Original release date	US release date
1	"Plane Crash"	April 19, 2010	TBA
The eight teens are dropped near the shore of a large lake, the "victims" of a floatplane crash. Justin and Nicole are parted from the others, and must survive the night on their own. Les Stroud reveals that he will declare one of the teens "Ultimate Survivor" at the end of the series.
2	"Boiling Point"	April 26, 2010	TBA
Les requires the main camp of teens to boil water using two different methods. If they succeed, Justin and Nicole will be returned. Meanwhile, the two teens separated from the group try to find food and water and keep calm while waiting for rescue.
3	"Snakes on a Plate"	May 3, 2010	TBA
The participants must gather as much food as they can during the next day. Les Stroud helps them out by providing them with a live snake which they can kill for meat. The participants decapitate and kill the snake for food.
4	"Sick and Tired"	May 10, 2010	TBA
Les sends the teens on a hike that will take several days to complete. They start out at night. Partway through the ordeal, Ian collapses from a real illness. The group splits up, dividing their resources. The teens debate how best to survive, and how to get reunited.
5	"Survival Trek"	May 17, 2010	TBA
The days-long hike continues. The teens are confronted by a cliff and a swift river with rapids. Deciding to risk it, they jump into the river but lose all their supplies. Les Stroud helps them by offering a single match.
6	"Cave Survival"	May 24, 2010	TBA
Les Stroud asks each teen to find a nearby cave and make a survival tool out of what they find there. Each teen must then build a fire. Michael, Manaal and Patricia leave the show.
7	"Medical Emergency"	May 31, 2010	TBA
Nicole is required to fake a medical emergency. The other four must transport the "injured" participant to a nearby log cabin, using only a compass for direction. If they make it to the cabin, they may use whatever supplies they find there. For some of the teens, the supplies prove more of problem than a solution.
8	"Fish Trip"	June 7, 2010	TBA
Les Stroud challenges each participant with a "fishing trip gone wrong." Each teen must now perform a task set by Les. At the end of the challenge, Les gives each teenager a fish, an axe, and a compass. They must find shelter and build a fire, but Justin and Nicole decide to leave the show.
9	"Fire Cross"	June 14, 2010	TBA
The remaining three teens must move a fire across some open water. Then they must build a fire and keep it going while building a shelter from items found on the shoreline. The three teens have a very bad argument. Colin and Jade succeed in the challenge, but Ian has a much more difficult time.
10	"Set Adrift"	June 21, 2010	TBA
Colin, Jade and Ian are dropped into the cold waters of Lake Huron. They are allowed to climb into a life raft, but must spend 24 hours on the open water while surviving wind, wet, and cold.
11	"Rescue Me"	June 28, 2010	TBA
After their difficult night on the open water, the life raft is beached on a deserted island in Georgian Bay (part of Lake Huron). Each surviving teen must build three unique signals of some kind which will draw a rescuer's attention. But a thunderstorm rapidly approaches, putting the signals at risk.
12	"Solo Survival"	July 5, 2010	TBA
Part one of a two-part finale. Each teen is given a flare gun, headlamp, knife, paddle, whistle, and a single match. Each teen must survive for several days, and demonstrate their survival skills. Ian fails to light a fire, putting himself at risk.
13	"Self Rescue/Finale"	July 12, 2010	TBA
Part two of a two-part finale. Each teen is led to a cache of survival gear. They are told to turn their shelter into a raft, and paddle to safety. Each surviving teen is reunited with their family and the teens who left the show. Les Stroud declares Colin the "Ultimate Survivor."
