= Survive This =

Canadian reality television show

- Genre: Reality television, Survival skills
- Created by: Les Stroud
- Starring: Les Stroud
- Narrated by: Les Stroud
- Country of origin: Canada
- Original language: English
- No. of seasons: 2
- No. of episodes: 26

Production
- Running time: 22 minutes
- Production company: 9 Story Entertainment

Original release
- Network: YTV
- Release: April 7, 2009 – July 12, 2010

Survive This is a Canadian reality television show in which eight teenagers with limited survival skills training are taken into a forest and confronted with a number of survival challenges to test their skills and perseverance. The series aired on YTV in Canada and Cartoon Network in the United States. The show is hosted by Les Stroud, who narrates each episode, provides the teens with survival challenges, and assesses their performance. The show premiered on April 7, 2009, in Canada and on June 17, 2009, in the United States. Cartoon Network ceased to air Survive This after August 19, 2009, and screened the final three episodes only on the network's website.

The series' second season debuted on April 19, 2010 and ended on July 12, 2010.

== Overview ==
The series began in 2009 with a single season of 13 episodes. A second season of 13 episodes began airing in April 2010. Each season begins with a fictional accident of some sort (a school bus crash in season one; a floatplane crash in season two) as a narrative hook and to introduce the participants to their first survival challenges.

Les Stroud, star and host of the television program Survivorman, introduces each episode and provides narrative commentary for the events depicted during the episode. Stroud also appears on camera at the beginning of each episode to meet with the participants, discuss their health and emotional status, and present them with the day's survival challenge. Stroud then departs. Stroud sometimes appears at halfway points in each episode to check on their status. Each challenge concludes with Stroud visiting the participants again, re-assessing their physical and emotional state, and asking whether anyone wishes to leave the show and go home.

The second season differed from the first as in the final episode, Les Stroud named one of the final participants, Colin as the "Ultimate Survivor". The question Stroud asked to the participants if they wanted to leave was also changed from "Who wants out?" to "Who can survive?".

== Production ==
=== Series production ===
Series creator Les Stroud says that he initially pitched Survive This, as a children's series similar to Survivorman and that several networks turned him down. The success of Survivorman enabled Stroud to pitch his original idea again, and this time the series was greenlighted in 2007 by 9 Story Entertainment, a Canadian entertainment company. Survive This is produced by 9 Story Entertainment, and two 9 Story executives (Vince Commisso and Steven Jarosz) serve as executive producers for the series. Les Stroud and his Survivorman production partner, David Brady, are also executive producers. Craig Baines is the producer.

The series was originally titled Survivorman: Kids Edition. The original concept was to create two teams of teens (age 13 to 17) and pit them against one another, testing their survivalist skills. This concept soon changed, however. In April 2008, 9 Story announced that the show (now called Survivorman Kids) would feature a single team of six 14- to 16-year-olds surviving in the wilderness for three weeks. The number of participants expanded to eight by the time filming began in summer 2008. In its final form, unlike other reality television shows, Survive This intentionally did not have a cash prize or other reward at the end of the season. Instead, the producers decided that contestants would leave the series with the knowledge that they survived a number of physically and mentally daunting challenges. Stroud refused to allow participants to vote their peers off the show or to win "immunity", arguing that this would change the focus of the series toward "backstabbing social networking" and away from survival skills and the wilderness experience.

Cast members were recruited in a variety of ways: Online, via forms at summer camps, and by several other means. After each person's application was screened by the producers, participants had to pass a telephone interview and a video interview before they were chosen for the show. Stroud was not involved in the actual selection process, but did provide some guidelines for the production company before the process began.

All I suggested within that process was get a good, wide selection of kids. Let’s get a wide selection of personalities and temperaments and certainly skill level. Don’t give me a whole bunch of boy scouts who are going to knock it dead out there and don’t give me a whole bunch of absolute beginners who are set up for failure. Give me a wide variety, let’s have regular, normal kids and don’t profile beyond that.

Once selected for the show, a camera crew filmed each teenager at home to get footage of them acting naturally in their home surroundings. The eight teenagers were taught for a week how to survive in a wilderness with limited supplies. They were also constantly filmed during this time, to acclimate them to the ever-present cameras and filmmakers.

=== Season 1 production ===
Eight teenagers, all between the ages of 14 and 17, were taken into a forest in Ontario, Canada, and initially asked to "survive" a school bus crash and spend two nights in the woods with limited food and other supplies.

The series was filmed on location in the forest north of Huntsville, Ontario, Canada. Filming occurred in the summer of 2008. Three days were spent on a small island northwest of Sandy Island on Georgian Bay in Lake Huron. Jeff Beitz, owner of the Georgian Bay Marina, acted as a location scout for the show, transported the participants to and from the island, and appeared on screen in Episode 11, "Island Castaways." Many of the challenges presented to the participants were based on situations Stroud himself faced on Survivorman.

A camera crew remained behind to film the participants as they carried out their survival challenges, some of which lasted several days. However, the camera crew was instructed not to interact with the participants. Several participants were also given hand-held video cameras and permitted to film their actions. A paramedic also was always on-site to provide emergency health care. Participants were forbidden to have any electronic devices with them, and could only speak to the producer or Stroud (who were both on-site). Stroud says that the participants constantly played to the camera, positioned themselves at the right camera angle to achieve the best pose, and—even though they were forbidden to do so—talked to the cinematographers to try to put themselves in a good light. Several of the participants were upset at the way their videotaped comments appeared on television. Some also expressed shock and surprise at the things others said about them in privately videotaped moments which later aired during the series. For his part, Stroud purposefully adopted a serious demeanor that involved never smiling in front of the participants. He later told TV Guide Canada that not providing suggestions, encouragement, or other assistance was difficult for him.

The participants were given little in the way of supplies. They had no camp stoves or sleeping bags, and at times water was so scarce that they squeezed liquid from moss.

The one-hour season 1 finale featured a search and rescue (SAR) operation to locate and extract the remaining participants. The Ontario Provincial Police (OPP) and the Georgian Bay Volunteer Search and Rescue (GBVSAR) participated in the filming of the final episode, which involved a GBVSAR search team and the OPP's K9, marine, and air units. Filming of the finale took a single day.

The final scenes were shot at the end of the summer of 2008. Some footage and a trailer for the show were shown at MIPCOM, a market and trade event in the entertainment industry held in Cannes, France. The first two completed episodes screened to buyers and markets at the MIPTV Media Market in March 2009. Corus Entertainment's YTV picked up the show for broadcast in Canada in April 2008. Time Warner's Cartoon Network agreed to air the show in the U.S. in March 2009. The first season ended with a one-hour finale. 9 Story Entertainment sold distribution rights to Cartoon Network's Boomerang Channel Latin America, YLE in Finland, and Teleview International in the Middle East in April 2009.

Producer 9 Story Entertainment began to license the show in May 2009, seeking to put the Survive This logo and images from the show on board games, books, video games, role-playing games, and clothing.

=== Season 2 production ===
Second season casting opened on June 5, 2009, and closed on July 10, 2009. Applicants were invited to a television production studio in Toronto, Ontario, Canada, where they met with the producers and had a screen test to determine how they came across on television. Participants were selected for the show, in part, based on their strong personalities. The final eight participants were told in early September 2009 that they were selected for the show. The eight teens who appear in the second season were required to sign a confidentiality agreement prior to the commencement of filming. All the participants were required to take a three-day survival program with David Arama, a wilderness survival expert and close friend of Les Stroud's. Training including how to build a shelter, fire-starting, edible plants, and using a compass.

Principal cinematography for the second season occurred in September 2009 (which meant some of the contestants missed the opening of school in order to finish the show). Most of the second season was filmed around the Georgian Bay area of Lake Huron and Algonquin Provincial Park. None of the teens knew the location of the series, but were aware that they were not close to any cities or towns. The teens were always watched by an adult and were provided warm clothes at night. Initially, many of the contestants did not take the show or host Les Stroud seriously. According to contestant Patricia Robins, "We were calling him Les Stroodle. ...at first we all thought he was kind of a jerk, just because of his attitude. [But] toward the end we kind of adopted him as a father figure. He's really protective. We found that out later on."

As in the first series, the teenaged contestants are introduced into the wilderness via an accident—in the second season, it is a floatplane crash. Two contestants were separated from the rest of the group and forced to spend a night alone. As in the previous season, the search for food is a major element of the show. In the first season, teenager Adam Deganis killed a pheasant (in the episode "Food") and a porcupine (in the episode "Deep Woods, Part I"). In the third episode of the second season, the participants decapitate and kill a snake for food. The show's format remains much the same, with a different challenge in each episode and Stroud asking the teens if they can survive at the end of each installment. An article about one of the contestants states that only one of the teens "survives" until the final episode, however this is incorrect. The actual number is determined by who drops out, and is mentioned on the official website's 'Synopsis page'.

The second season of Survive This consists of 13 episodes, with a one-hour finale. The second season debuted on the YTV cable TV channel on Monday, April 19, 2010.

== Participants ==
=== Season 1 ===
In the first season, eight teenagers were given a week's survival training before being taken into the wilderness. The season 1 cast included:

- Adam—Adam Deganis is a 15-year-old native of Mississauga, Ontario, who attends Loyola Catholic Secondary School. Labeled as "the sportsman" on the series, his survival experiences consisted of hunting, fishing, and spending summers at his family vacation home. A fan of Survivorman, he applied to be on the series because he wanted to meet Les Stroud. Deganis is an arachnophobe.
- Becca—Becca Mehaffey is a 16-year-old from Markham, Ontario, who has almost no outdoors experience. Her friends and family laughed at her when she applied to be on the show. She was called "the princess" on the show, and practices dance in her spare time.
- Becky—Becky Tran is a 17-year-old from Newmarket, Ontario, who was labeled "the environmentalist" on the series, but whom the other participants called "BT." Tran, who is admittedly "addicted" to her hair iron, was frightened of dirt, germs, and insects.
- Catarina—Catarina is a 17-year-old who was described as "the tough girl" on the series.
- Holden—Holden Adams is a 16-year-old who was called "the city boy" on the show. After the show ended, he admitted that lack of sleep, hunger, and physical exhaustion often led him to rest while others did the work of finding food and building shelter. Adams died in February 2015.
- Jen—Jennifer Daub is a 16-year-old resident of Blind River, Ontario. She attends W. C. Eaket Secondary School. She was labeled "the hunter" on the series because she had spent time tracking and hunting deer with her father, and was an expert rifleman, all-terrain vehicle driver, and camper. One of her older brothers learned about the show and encouraged her to apply. She applied online by sending in a photo of herself with a deer she had shot and killed. She was often frustrated on the show by having to help other participants who had little outdoors experience.
- Kareem—Kareem Ali is a 17-year-old native of Toronto, Ontario, Canada. Given the label of "the motivator" by the producers, he was seen as more competitive than the others. He attends Bloor Collegiate Institute.
- Zac—Zac Siegel is a 14-year-old resident of Thornhill, Ontario, who attends Westmount Collegiate Institute. He applied to be on the show through a survival camp he was already enrolled at. He had extensive wilderness survival skills before he joined the show, has a photographic memory, and a high-level intelligence. He was extremely frustrated on the show because the other participants had so little wilderness survival skill. "In many cases I had to teach people to start a fire or build a proper shelter, collect berries, basically I spent a lot of time with those who didn't have a clue what Les was talking about," he told the press. Labeled as "the camp counselor" by the producers, the other participants saw him as an overachiever.

=== Season 2 ===
In the first season, eight teenagers were given a week's survival training before being taken into the wilderness. The season 2 cast included:

- Colin—Colin is a 15-year-old from Hamilton, Ontario. He believes that a balance between a social life and school is important. He was labelled "The Whiz Kid".
- Ian—Ian McBain is a 14-year-old from Ajax, Ontario. Interested in animals and the outdoors and seeking a career as a biologist, McBain was inspired to audition for the second season after seeing the first-season episode Swamp: "The episode from the first season that really motivated me to try to get on the show was the swamp episode. "Most people would think 'Oh gross. a swamp, there's leeches and stuff.' That was the turning point for me, I was like 'I have to get on this show, that looks so fun, so many different experiences.' He was dubbed "The Book Worm" McBain, who admits to being an unadventurous "wimp", says that he learned to trust other people and believe in himself during the show. For him, the toughest part of the series was getting through the nights and worrying about wild animal attacks.
- Jade—Jade is a 13-year-old girl from Ancaster, Ontario. She was raised on a farm and was labelled "The Country Girl".
- Justin—Justin Cutajar is a 16-year-old from Mississauga, Ontario labelled "the Rock Star". He had auditioned for the first season but did not make the cut. He auditioned for the second season because he still wanted to see how far he could push himself. He says being on the show was "a life-altering experience." The hardest part, for him, was the lack of food; he lost 12 pounds (5.4 kg) while filming the series. Back at home after the show, he says he never leaves food on his plate and reminds himself every day of how he has a bed to sleep in and home to live in. he cites patience, emotional strength, the will to live, and physical strength as the things which allowed him to get through the show.
- Manaal—Manaal Ismacil is a 16-year-old from St. Catharines, Ontario labeled "The Diplomat". Her mother is a Somalian who is a refugee from Somalia. Manaal was born in Kenya, but her family emigrated to the United States when she was seven years old and to Canada four years later. She attends Sir Winston Churchill Secondary School, loves to read and study, and has never been camping. She had not seen the first season, but applied after being urged to do so by her younger sister (who had). She is interested in International relations, and wants a career as a human rights lawyer. She is a volunteer in many groups, including her school, the St. Catharines mayor's council, and Save the Children Canada.
- Michael—Michael Lattouf is a 17-year-old from Brampton, Ontario, who attends Notre Dame Catholic Secondary School and wants to be an actor, earning him the label "The Entertainer". He had no survival skills prior to appearing on the show. He says that he felt overwhelmed at first. The producers and Les Stroud "just threw us right in, and it was non-stop," and he felt the lack of food was the most challenging aspect of the show. He also felt that having eight teenagers on the show made for a lot of emotion. Lattouf says the show was very challenging, and he learned a great deal from it. "People live like this every day—homeless people, or people in poor countries—and it made me understand their struggles more."
- Nicole—Nicole Ponce is a 14-year-old girl who is heavily involved in school athletics, giving her the label "the Athlete". She resides in Etobicoke, Ontario and is a freshman at Michael Power/St. Joseph High School. At a young age, she was often bullied before organized sports made its way into her life. She plays competitively and with a positive attitude in a number of sports including soccer, basketball and volleyball. She hopes to someday become a pediatrician and aspires to help children in need. With her charming personality and newly found confidence, she is ready to take on every challenge the wilderness and life has to offer.
- Patricia—Patricia (Trish) Robins is a 16-year-old from Niagara Falls, Ontario. She attends Stamford Collegiate Secondary School. She applied to be on the show without having seen the first season. She believed that only actors were admitted to the show, and felt that this would be a boost to her acting career. After seeing the first season, she resolved to turn down the show if offered a chance to compete and then later changes her mind. Labeled as "The Rebel" on the show, she says she is more of a diva.

== Critical reception ==
=== Season 1 critical reception ===
At least one psychologist warned that Survive This risked being exploitative and might damage the mental health of the participants. "You're putting kids into real emotional situations for other people's enjoyment," said Jennifer Kolari, a child and family therapist and author. "It's okay to have some competition, it's okay to try out for things," she says. "Those are okay lessons for kids. But doing it on national television, to be watched and judged, that's where I feel it's a little bit exploitive, and I think we need to consider the mental health of the kids that are on that show." But other mental health experts declared the show safe, concluding that the participants merely displayed strong competitiveness and that social ostracization was largely avoided.

Several reviewers have strongly criticized Survive This. For example, the New Bedford Standard-Times was dismissive of the show's lack of originality, noting: "...a gruff, gritty, macho mountain man takes a group of high-school kids and dumps them in the deep woods where they must learn to put aside their 'drama' and adapt. Gee, where haven't we seen that before?" Variety was equally critical of the show's lack of originality, observing that the show "play[ed] like junior editions of somebody else's reality franchise. The publication was also critical of the way the show pigeonholed and labeled each of the teenagers, eliminating the diversity of the racially and ethnically diverse cast. The Los Angeles Times also concluded that the show was vapid, but that it had slightly more "depth" than other Cartoon Network live-action programs.

Some critics have also blasted Cartoon Network for showing live-action programs rather than cartoons.

However, the Sudbury Star called the show "compelling".

=== Season 1 ratings ===
Television ratings information on the show is difficult to come by. However, at least one newspaper said the show was not "catching on with viewers" on Cartoon Network, and that the show had never been among that network's top 10 series.

=== Season 2 critical reception ===
In March 2010, Toronto resident Richard Code, a fan of Stroud's show Survivorman, was found dead from hypothermia near his campsite at the north end of Horn Lake (near McMurrich/Monteith, Ontario). Code was on a winter camping trip with few supplies, similar to summer trips he'd taken before in admiration of the adventures he had seen on Survivorman. Learning of Code's death, Stroud said, "It's a terrible tragedy and I feel absolutely terrible for the families involved"—but did not know Code or the situation he was in, and refused to comment further on his death.

At least one reviewer has criticized Survive This for not mentioning Code's death or warning kids not to imitate what they see on the show. The Globe and Mail reviewer Catherine Dawson March wrote, "You'd think, just seven weeks after Code's headline-making death, that Survive This would make a passing nod to the tragedy. ... Some kind of 'don't try this on your own' advice. But no." Dawson praised the show as "captivating" with "lots of emotional drama", but concluded: "It's great stuff, but YTV should acknowledge Code's death with a warning of their own." YTV replied, "As Survive This does not follow the same premise as Survivorman, there will not be a disclaimer before each episode."

== See also ==
- Survive This (Season One)
- Survive This (Season Two)
