= New Regime =

New Regime may refer to:

- New Regime (American band), active 1979–85
- New Regime (Canadian band), formed in 1982
- The New Regime, a name used by musician Ilan Rubin for his solo work
