= Julie Zwillich =

American actress

Julie Zwillich (/ˈzwɪlɪk/ ZWIL-ik) is a Canadian and American television personality. She is the host of Food Network Canada's Summer's Best and CBC's Surprise! It's Edible Incredible! She became a television personality in 1997 with the debut of Stuff, which aired on TVOntario, ABC Australia, across Asia and South America, and on the WAM! network in the US. Her co-host, Kevin Brauch, went on to become The Thirsty Traveler.

Zwillich was a host on the popular TVOKids live broadcast from 1999 to 2002 and went on to host BrainBounce! on TV Ontario and Discovery UK, and the sports show SWEAT on OLN and TSN. She is also an actor, and performed all 26 characters on The Blobs, played the characters Emily and Enrique on Beyblade and is the voice of multiple characters on CBC's kid show, The X. Zwillich can be seen hosting videos for Kraft Foods, WalMart and other companies as well as on Yahoo! Shine and Deepak Chopra's Chopra Well channel on YouTube.
