= Algoma District School Board =

School board in Ontario, Canada

Coordinates: 46°30′34″N 84°19′37″W

Location
- 644 Albert St. E. Sault Ste. Marie, Ontario P6A 2K7 Algoma District Canada

District information
- Type: Public
- Motto: Confident Learners, Caring Citizens
- Grades: K to 12
- Chief executive officer: Lucia Reece
- Chair of the board: Elaine Johnston
- Schools: 39 (Elementary), 10 (Secondary)
- Budget: CAD 182,000,000 (2022–2023)

Other information
- Superintendent of Business: Joe Santa Maria
- Superintendents of Education: Joe Maurice, Brent Vallee, Marcy Bell
- Website: www.adsb.on.ca

Algoma District School Board (known as English-language Public District School Board No. 2 prior to 1999) is a public school board in the Canadian province of Ontario. The school board is the school district administrator for the Algoma District.

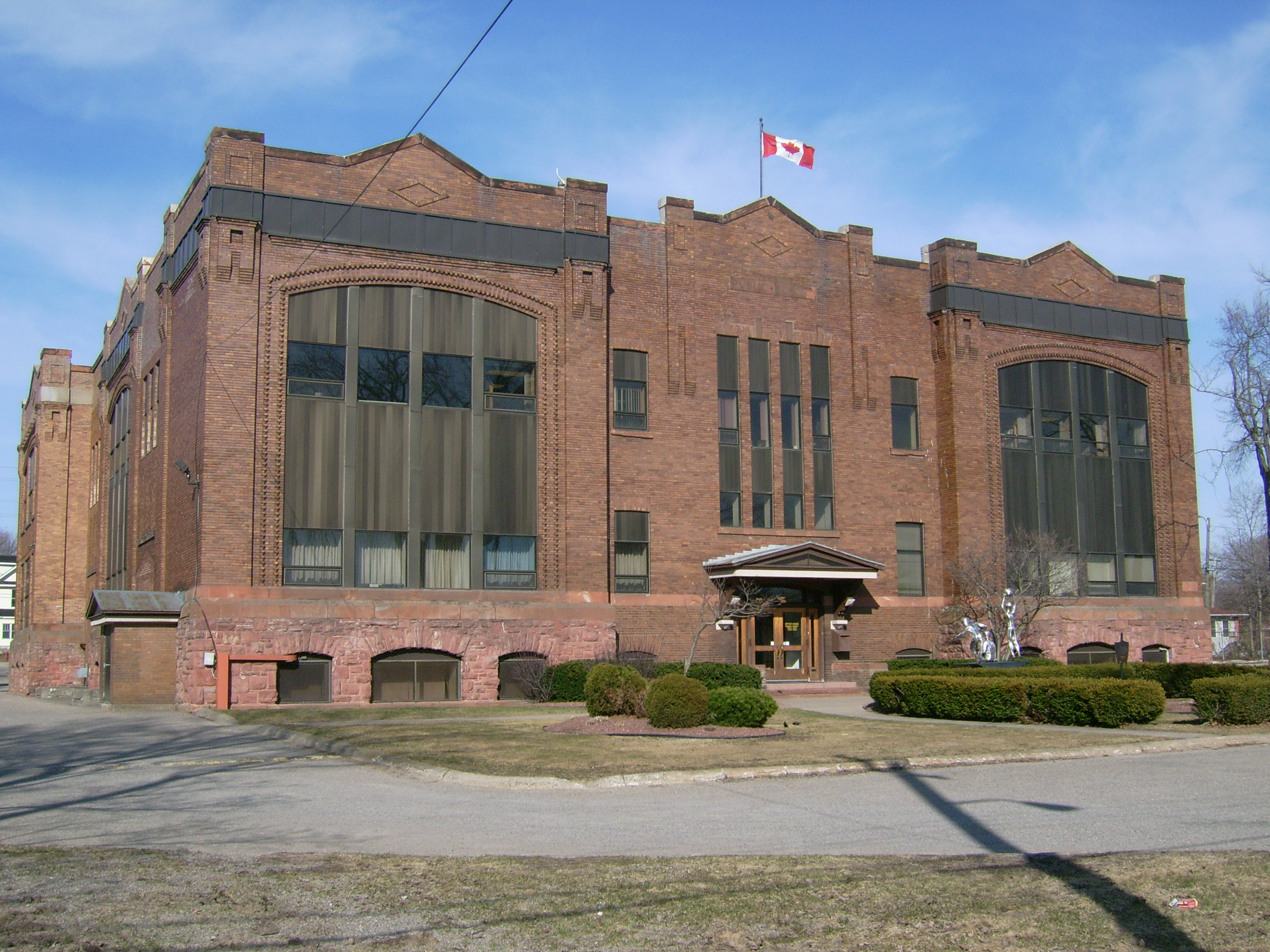
Algoma District School Board building, Sault Ste. Marie, Ontario.

== Elementary schools ==
=== Blind River ===
- Blind River Public School

=== Bruce Mines ===
- Arthur Henderson Public School

=== Chapleau ===
- Chapleau Public School

=== Desbarats ===
- Central Algoma Secondary School
- Central Algoma Intermediate School
- Central Algoma Elementary School

=== Echo Bay ===
- Echo Bay Central Public School

=== Elliot Lake ===
- Central Avenue Public School
- Esten Park Public School

=== Goulais River ===
- Mountain View Public School

=== Hornepayne ===
- Hornepayne Public School

=== Iron Bridge ===
- Iron Bridge Public School

=== Richards Landing ===
- St. Joseph Island Public School

=== Sault Ste. Marie ===
- Anna McCrea Public School
- Ben R. McMullin Public School
- Boréal Public School (French Immersion, JK-8)
- Eastview Public School
- F.H. Clergue Public School (French Immersion, JK-8)
- Grand View Public School
- Greenwood Public School
- H.M. Robbins Public School
- Isabel Fletcher Public School
- Kiwedin Public School
- Northern Heights Public School
- Parkland Public School
- Pinewood Public School
- Queen Elizabeth Public School
- River View Public School
- R.M.Moore Public School
- Tarentorus Public School
- Alex Muir Public School (Closed)
- Aweres Public School (Closed)
- Bay View Public School (Closed)
- Étienne Brûlé Public School (Closed)
- Manitou Park Public School (Closed)
- Rosedale Public School (French Immersion 4-8) (Closed)
- William Merrifield Public School (Closed)

=== Serpent River ===
- Rockhaven School

=== Spanish ===
- Spanish Public School (Closed)

=== Thessalon ===
- Thessalon Public School

=== Wawa ===
- Sir James Dunn Public School

== Intermediate schools ==
=== Desbarats ===
- Central Algoma Intermediate School

=== Sault Ste. Marie ===
- Korah Intermediate School
- Superior Heights Intermediate School (7-12)
- White Pines Intermediate School

== Secondary schools ==
=== Blind River ===
- W.C. Eaket Secondary School

=== Chapleau ===
- Chapleau High School

=== Desbarats ===
- Central Algoma Secondary School

=== Elliot Lake ===
- Elliot Lake Secondary School

=== Hornepayne ===
- Hornepayne High School

=== Sault Ste Marie ===
- Korah Collegiate & Vocational School
- Prince Charles Secondary School (Adult Education)
- Superior Heights Collegiate & Vocational School (French Immersion, 7-12)
- White Pines Collegiate & Vocational School
- Alexander Henry High School (Closed in 2012)
- Bawating Collegiate and Vocational School (Closed in 2011)
- Sir James Dunn Collegiate and Vocational School (Closed in 2011)
- Lakeway Collegiate & Vocational School (as Sault Technical and Commercial High School in 1921 and closed 1987)

=== Wawa ===
- Michipicoten High School

== See also ==
- List of school districts in Ontario
- List of high schools in Ontario
