= The Blobs =

British animated television series

The Blobs is an animated television series based on the books by DC Thomson, published in 1980. It tells the story of a community of colourful paint-splash characters who live in Paintbox Land. The 26-episode series, narrated originally by Jane Horrocks, was produced in 1996 by Siriol Animation in Wales, in association with DC Thomson & Co., S4C and Scottish Television (now STV Central). The series was picked up by TV Ontario in 1999, and was re-voiced by Julie Zwillich for the North American market.

A Welsh-language version was also produced for S4C, entitled Y Blobs.

== Content ==
Jane Horrocks and Julie Zwillich (U.S. only) narrate the show in their own voices and affect different voices for all the characters. The blobs usually have a problem to solve that involves helping others, learning not to be afraid, getting lost, etc. They can also change their shapes at will. Paintbox Land is ruled by a king, Royal Blue, and is bothered by a pesky witch, Inky Black. The show's animation style stays true to the books by DC Thomson.

Pre-production for the show was done at Siriol Scotland and the animation production itself was completed at Siriol Animation's main studios in Mount Stuart Square, Bute Town (now Cardiff Bay) in Cardiff, Wales.

== Characters ==
- Fizzy Orange
- Puppy Purple
- Grumbly Green
- Royal Blue
- Princess Powder Blue
- Sailor Blue
- Constable Blue
- Mousy Brown
- Piggy Pink
- Primrose Yellow
- Inky Black
- Ghostly White
- Chocolate Brown
- Poppy Red
- Rainbow Blob
- Grubby Grey
- Giant Blob
- Floury White
- Canary Yellow
- Spotty Blob
- Vincent van Blob
- The Blob Cats
- Olive Green
- Ringmaster Blob
- Butterfly Blob
- Other Blobs
