= Summer's Best =

Canadian television series

Summer's Best is a Food Network Canada show hosted by Julie Zwillich.

Julie Zwillich travels around vacation country in Ontario visiting local artisans and preparing seasonal recipes at high-end vacation homes. Every episode revolves around a local ingredient(s) and the activities in the area. Many of the episodes involve barbecuing and outdoor dining. Since much of "cottage country" exists near lakes, water sports such as water skiing, wakeboarding, sailing, cliff jumping and snorkeling are often featured.

Summer's Best was created and produced by Tony Armstrong for Cottage Life Television.
