= Sir James Dunn Collegiate and Vocational School =

Former high school in Sault Ste. Marie, Ontario, Canada

Location
- 1601 Wellington Street East; Sault Ste. Marie, Ontario, P6A 2R8; Canada; 46°30′31″N 84°17′19″W

Information
- Type: Public secondary school
- Established: October 30, 1957
- Closed: June 25, 2010
- School district: Algoma District School Board
- Grades: 9-12
- Colors: Green and gold
- Mascot: Eagle
- Nickname: Eagles
- Yearbook: Aquila

Sir James Dunn Collegiate and Vocational School (SJD, The Dunn) was a secondary school that operated at 1601 Wellington Street East in Sault Ste. Marie, Ontario from 1957 to 2010. It was named for Canadian financier and industrialist James Hamet Dunn (1874–1956). The building was demolished in August 2016.

== History ==
Sir James Dunn Collegiate and Vocational School was Sault Ste. Marie's third public secondary school and its first comprehensive school, combining education in both trades and academics.

In 1955, the city was facing over-crowding at its two high schools. Estimating that by 1959, space would be needed for nearly 1,000 new students, the board of education began planning for a third secondary school to relieve Sault Collegiate Institute and Sault Technical and Commercial School.

In August 1955 the board of education received city council's approval for a $854,000 debenture to build a new secondary school on the land to the north portion of the Shingwauk Indian Residential School site in the city's south-east. While some argued for a school in the west end of the city where none existed, the board's chair Orval Grant countered that population growth was trending towards the east end of the city. He told councillors “We are not overly happy with the proposed location. However, it is the only available one at this time.”

In February 1956, the board of education announced that following a request from his widow, the new composite school would be named for industrialist Sir James Hamet Dunn who had financially rescued Algoma Steel in 1935 and had died the month prior.

By March 1956, the Ontario government had approved the plans for the new high school to be built on the grounds north of the Shingwalk property and tenders for construction were issued. The board began planning for the new school to initially accommodate over 500 students in grades nine and ten in the first year.

While construction was underway, Sir James Dunn students attended the Technical and Commercial School on a staggered basis for the 1956–57 school year.

Constructed over two years, the school was officially opened on October 30, 1957. At 6,800 m^{2}, the two-story structure consisted of approximately 17 classrooms, two gymnasiums, a lunch room, library and auto, machine and wood working shops, and rooms for drafting, art and music.

Over the next 31 years, the school would expand four times. In 1961, 5,000 m^{2} were added for a new cafeteria, staff room, kitchen, additional classrooms, a shop area, and additional washrooms. In 1965, a space for team sports storage and weight room was added, as well as a new music room, and new classrooms on the second floor. In 1968, a machine shop was added on the first floor. And in 1988, a 525 m^{2} library was added.

In its final form, the school consisted of 36 classrooms, six science laboratories, seven technology shops, two gymnasiums with two sets of change rooms, a library with study areas, a family studies room, a music room, a cafeteria, a theatre, a weight room, a staff room, as well as several offices and meeting rooms.

Students from the Shingwauk Indian Residential School attended Sir James Dunn from the time of its opening until the closure of Shingwauk in 1970. This was part of a broader integration program operated by the Federal government in concert with the residential school system.

For the first seven months of the 1988–89 school year, Sir James Dunn students shared the school with students from White Pines Collegiate in the city's east end while that school was undergoing rehabilitation. Dunn students attended from 8 am to noon, while White Pines students had classes from 1 to 5 pm.

With the school-aged population beginning to decrease in the early 2000s, the school board was faced with a reversal of the trend that had necessitated the construction of Sir James Dunn fifty years earlier. In 2003 the school board undertook a system-wide study to make “recommendations for the effective use of facilities.” The study found that while the school's 1994 enrolment had neared its capacity of 1,166, current enrolment was 77 per cent of that capacity and projected to fall to only 56 per cent in five years. Further, the physical assessment of the building identified a range of deficiencies with electrical, ventilation and windows. In June 2008, the school board took the decision to close Sir James Dunn, as well as Bawating Collegiate in the city's north-west in order to combine the remaining enrolment in a new high school for the 2010–11 school year.

While the new school was being constructed at the former Bawating site, students attended classes for the 2010–11 school year at the Sir James Dunn building which was temporary renamed Superior Heights. The new school, Superior Heights Collegiate and Vocational School opened at 750 North Street for the 2011–12 school year.

For a time after, the building operated as the Sir James Dunn Centre and was the home of the community's Christmas Cheer Depot.

With items and equipment having been removed or auctioned off earlier that year, the Sir James Dunn building was demolished in August 2016.

== Enrolment ==
The school had a peak enrolment of 1,161 students in 1994, very near its full capacity of 1,166. The school's catchment area included the central-eastern part of the city, bordered by East Street to the west and Boundary Road to the east, the St. Marys River to the south, and with its northern portion extending as far as the P-Patch neighbourhood north of McNabb Street.

Public elementary schools that fed enrolment at Sir James Dunn included Alex Muir, Anna McCrea, Ben R. McMullin, East View, Queen Elizabeth, River View and Rosedale public schools.

== Activities ==
The school was recognized in its community for its leading music, arts, and athletics programs, with its students having won many local sports championships and arts and music competitions. An Eagle mascot represented its sports teams and clubs.

Dunnplugged was a concert performed by students in the school theatre during lunch hour. Performances included bands, instrumentalists, and acoustic performances.

== Notable alumni ==
- Dr. Roberta Bondar, the first Canadian female astronaut and the first neurologist in space
- Caleb Flaxey, Canadian curler
- Wayne Gretzky, Canadian professional hockey player and coach
- Tanya Kim, television personality and host
- Kalle Mattson, singer-songwriter
- Karl Morin-Strom, Member of Provincial Parliament for Sault Ste. Marie (1985–1990)
- Treble Charger, rock band formed at Sir James Dunn by students Greig Nori, Bill Priddle, Rosie Martin, and Richard Mulligan

== Popular culture ==
Prior to its demolition, the school was used as a shooting location for the 2016 film The Void.
