= BrainBounce! =

Canadian television program

BrainBounce! was produced by Megafun Productions and aired on TV Ontario from 2001 to 2004. It currently airs on Discovery Kids in the UK. The series was shot in Montreal and Toronto as a "piggyback" production: the original French version, Le Monde a la Loupe (hosted by Stéphanie Allaire) was shot at the same time in each location.

Each episode begins in an "ordinary" place - a camp site, a dance studio, a movie theatre - and jumps into one fantasy world after another as more questions are discovered. Some have described the show as "stream-of-consciousness" or "encyclopedia" television. Subjects such as art, music, science, animals, the human body are explored by way of sketches, interviews with guest experts, experiments and mini-documentaries.

== Content ==
Julie Zwillich plays herself as the main host of the show, and also plays most of the characters who appear in her "brainbounces". Zwillich also wrote the lyrics for and sings the theme song at the beginning of the show.

== Characters ==
- Elsa Fullbrain
- Pabla Picante
- Salvador Dalí (voice)
- Giant Stick of Gum
- Barry Metric
- Pain (Cavity)
- Scott McScotia
- Connie Contatious
- Cow (voice)
- Chanel the Skunk (voice)
- Farm Dog (voice)
- Silent Film Starlet
- Kathleen Kleen
- Bedouin
- Alien (voice)

== Episodes ==
- The Cemetery
- The Street Busker
- The Cinema
- The Cliff
- The Pool
- The Apartment
- The Farm
- The Video Store
- The Dance Class
- The Shopping Center
- The Dentist
- The Supermarket
- The Campsite
