= Kalle Mattson =

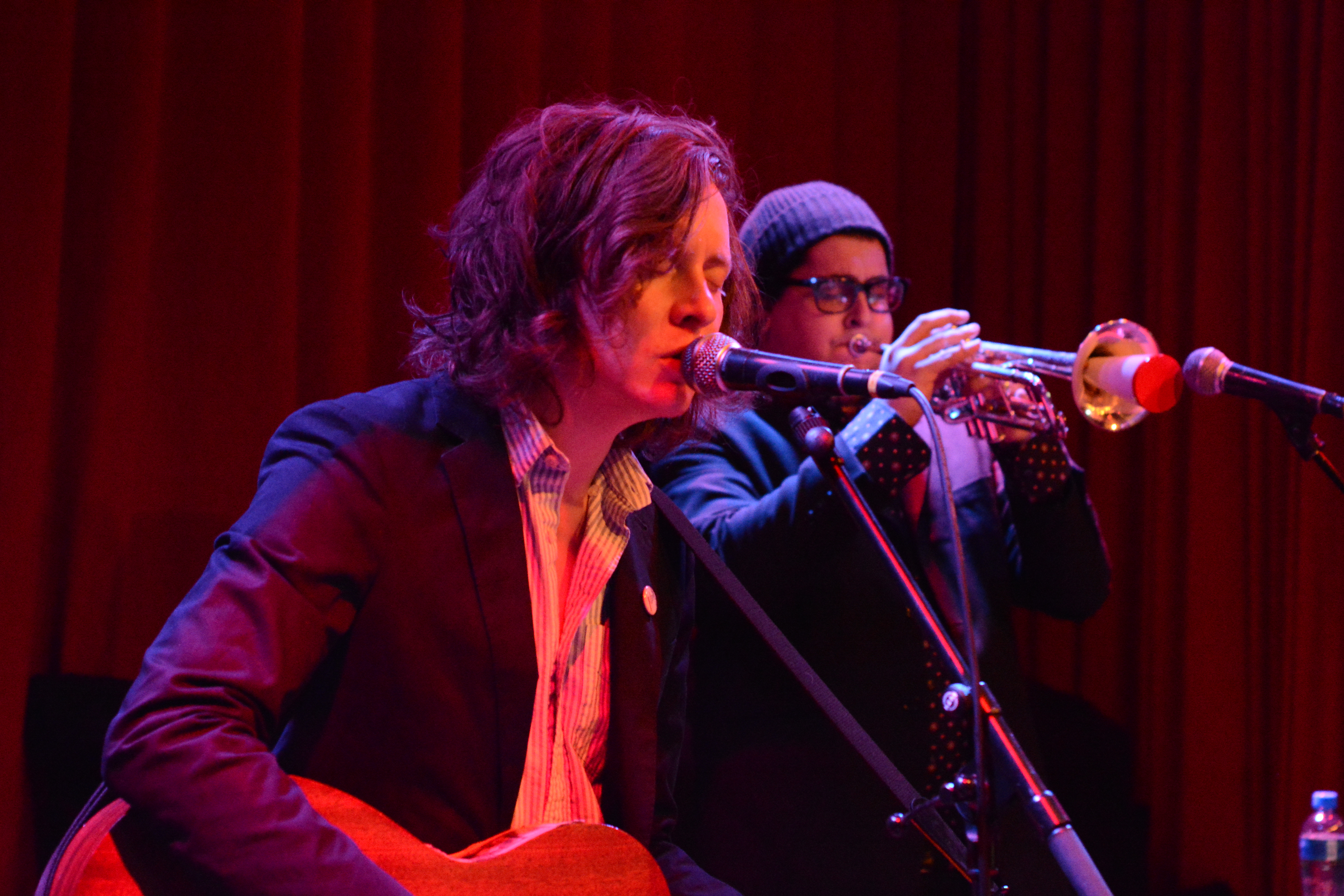
- Kalle Mattson, January 2014

Background information
- Born: September 21, 1990 (age 35); Sault Ste. Marie, Ontario, Canada
- Origin: Ottawa, Ontario
- Genres: Folk rock, alternative rock
- Occupations: Musician, songwriter
- Years active: 2009–present
- Labels: Home Music Co., Parliament of Trees, Trickser Tonträger
- Website: www.kallemattson.com

Kalle Mattson (born Kalle Mattson Wainio, September 21, 1990, in Sault Ste. Marie, Ontario) is a Canadian singer-songwriter based in Ottawa, Ontario. He has performed both as a solo artist and with his duo-project summersets since 2020.

== History ==
Wainio was a high school student at Sir James Dunn Collegiate and Vocational School in Sault Ste. Marie, when he began writing songs under the pseudonym Kalle Mattson to deal with his grief after his mother, Anne Gilmour, who died of cancer when he was 16. In 2008 he released a 6-song EP Telescope, limited to 150 copies, he self-recorded the EP with childhood friend Rory Lewis.

He released his first full-length album Whisper Bee in 2009. It featured Lewis, local musician Frank Deresti and was recorded at the Sir James Dunn Collegiate and Vocational School music studio and was produced by teacher Mark Gough.

By 2011 Kalle Mattson had grown into a full-band featuring Lewis, and fellow Sault-ites Thean Slabbert and Jimmie Chiverelli. The band released the album Anchors in 2011. The video for the song "Thick As Thieves", a "stop motion history of the world" created by animator Kevin Parry, attracted the band's first widespread media attention; as a result, the band signed to the independent record label Parliament of Trees, which reissued Anchors in late 2011.

In 2012, they released the EP Lives in Between. The EP was supported by the single "Water Falls", whose video was again animated by Parry as a portrait of San Francisco.

In 2014 Mattson released the full-length album Someday, the Moon Will Be Gold. The album was produced by Gavin Gardiner from The Wooden Sky and featured Jeremy Fisher, members of Cuff The Duke along with contributions from Lewis, Slabbert, JF Beauchamp and Kyle Woods. The album's cover was a painting by Mattson's mother, and the lyrical themes addressed Mattson coming to terms with the deaths of his mother and grandmother. The album was supported by concert tours in Europe and Canada, and was longlisted for the 2014 Polaris Music Prize. Mattson won Best Songwriter and Best Album by a Solo Artist at the 2015 Northern Ontario Music & Film Awards.

Mattson released the six-song EP Avalanche in August 2015. The EP was produced by Colin Munroe and featured Ottawa musician Jim Bryson. The EP's title track was accompanied by a video, directed by Philip Sportel, which depicts Mattson creatively recreating 35 iconic album covers over the course of 3:45 featuring the likes of Elliott Smith, Jay-Z, Wilco, Radiohead, The Velvet Underground, Bruce Springsteen, Bob Dylan and Beck. The video received a Juno Award nomination for Video of the Year at the Juno Awards of 2016 and a MuchMusic Video Award nomination for Best Director at the 2016 iHeartRadio Much Music Video Awards, and won the 2016 Prism Prize.

Later in 2015, he released a non-album acoustic cover of Drake's single "Hotline Bling".

In 2016, Mattson toured Canada as an opening act for Jason Collett.

He released his album, Youth, in 2018. The album was once again produced by Colin Munroe and was mixed by Noah Georgeson.

Mattson has also collaborated with Andrew Sowka in the project summersets, which released the EP small town saturday in 2020. and follow-up EP small town sunday in 2021, and debut record in 2023 small town story, is set in small town northern Ontario town and follows the relationship of two fictional character from the moment they meet until one passes away across the 16 song album produced by Jim Bryson.

Mattson currently teaches in the Music Department at Carleton University where he is an ensemble director, performance instructor and contract instructor.

== Discography ==
Year	Album	Record label	Act
2008	Telescope	Independent release	Kalle Mattson
2009	Whisper Bee	Independent release	Kalle Mattson
2011	Anchors	Parliament of Trees	Kalle Mattson
2012	Lives in Between	Parliament of Trees	Kalle Mattson
2014	Someday, The Moon Will Be Gold	Parliament of Trees	Kalle Mattson
2015	Avalanche	Home Music. CO	Kalle Mattson
2018	Youth	Independent release	Kalle Mattson
2020	small town saturday (EP)	Independent release	summersets
2021	small town sunday (EP)	Independent release	summersets
2023	small town story	Independent release	summersets

== See also ==
- Music of Canada
- Canadian rock
- List of Canadian musicians
- List of bands from Canada
