= Korah Collegiate & Vocational School =

Korah Collegiate and Vocational School

Location
- 636 Goulais street Sault Ste. Marie, Ontario; Canada; 46.54217°N 84.38100°W

Information
- Type: Secondary, Intermediate
- Motto: "A Quoque Optimum" ("For his/her best")
- Founded: 1967
- School board: Algoma District School Board
- Principal: Amy Ward
- Staff: 90
- Grades: 7-12
- Enrollment: 1274
- Language: English
- Colours: Yellow/gold, brown, white
- Mascot: KC - Horse
- Team name: Colts
- Website: korahcvs.adsb.on.ca

Korah Collegiate and Vocational School is a public secondary school located on Goulais Avenue in Sault Ste. Marie. It was established in 1967 by the Algoma District School Board. It holds both a 9 to 12 secondary program and a smaller 7/8 intermediate program. It primarily services students in the west end of the city, as well as other parts of the Algoma District including Prince.

== Notable alumni ==
- Crystal Shawanda - Canadian country singer

== See also ==
- Education in Ontario
- List of high schools in Ontario
