= Surprise! It's Edible Incredible! =

- Genre: Game show
- Created by: Jean Louis Côté; Paul Vinet
- Directed by: Heidi Miller, Richard Mortimer; Eric Savage; Mike Csunyoscka
- Starring: Julie Zwillich; Mike Paterson; Alex Orlando
- Country of origin: Canada
- Original language: English
- No. of seasons: 2
- No. of episodes: 52

Production
- Executive producer: Jonathan Finklestein
- Producer: Jean Louis Côté
- Running time: 30 minutes
- Production company: Apartment 11 Productions

Original release
- Network: Discovery Kids Canada (2004–2009); CBC Kids (2004–2008, again in 2011); BBC Kids (2011–2013)
- Release: August 30, 2004 – April 3, 2008

Surprise! It's Edible Incredible! is a Canadian children's cooking game show series which premiered in 2004, starring Julie Zwillich as the host. Children auditioned to become contestants, who were videotaped at home so that the audiences see their eating habits, and learned to cook for their family and friends.

Co-stars included Mike Paterson as Mr. Gross, and Alex Orlando as the chef. The series was created by Jean Louis Côté and Paul Vinet, and was produced by Apartment 11 Productions.

== Format ==
Each week, two contestants are surprised by their friends by throwing ribbons and streamers and brought onto the show. The contestants then sit in the "Hot Seat," which takes on different forms each season.

In Season 1, it looked like a brick oven, while in Season 2, it resembled a real oven. Hosts Julie and Mr. Gross show a short video of themselves snooping in the contestants' houses and asking their parents about their food preferences.

The contestants are then given a list of ingredients and must race around the grocery store to find them. They must guess if the ingredients they find are the correct ones, and if they are, they earn a point.

The hosts then announce the "Grosstacle," a challenge where the contestants must eat the foods they dislike. Afterward, they must continue searching for the remaining foods on their list.

Another Grosstacle occurs, which involves a physical challenge where the first contestant to hit a button is checked by Mr. Gross to see if they have found the correct items. In Season 1, each player's items were scanned individually, and if they got it right, they earned a point. In Season 2, Mr. Gross tells the contestants who got it right or wrong.

In Season 1, a clue coupon was given for a bonus point, with up to three clues given, each worth different points. If neither player guesses correctly, Mr. Gross reveals the answer. This was dropped in Season 2.

Chef Alex then demonstrates two recipes based on the contestants' favorite foods to the contestants, and they are tasked with cooking it in the "Cooking Ring." They are allowed to choose two friends from the audience to help them. Chef Alex rates their dishes, with up to three points given in Season 1 and up to five points in Season 2.

The dishes are then judged in a blind taste test by a panel of five of the contestants' friends known as the "Taste Buds", who wear special goggles to prevent them from seeing the food. The contestant with the most points wins an outdoor adventure trip, chosen from three destinations in Season 1 and two destinations in Season 2. In the event of a tie, both players receive a trip.

Both players are given a gift for participating in the show.

== Episodes ==
Season 1

- 1. Surf and Turf Bob (pilot episode / series premiere)
- 2. It's a Hot Dog's Life!
- 3. Surely You Kid, Squid!
- 4. Lobster Trap
- 5. Soupy Sprouts
- 6. Fruit Cakewalk
- 7. Go Fish!
- 8. Food on the Run
- 9. Shinny Shinny Mo Mango Bop
- 10. Dressed to Chill
- 11. Tomato Spit
- 12. Spew Stew
- 13. Crispy Rice Face
- 14. Jiggle Toss
- 15. Pearl Onion Diving
- 16. Sour Power
- 17. Chop `n' Plop
- 18. Great Eggspectations
- 19. Fish Head Splatter Ball
- 20. Eye Can't Believe Eye Hate the Whole Thing
- 21. Popcorn Topping
- 22. Fortune Cookie Tree
- 23. Pie in the Sky
- 24. Chocolate Found-Ehwww!
- 25. Balanced Breakfast
- 26. Puddin' Plunge

Season 2

- 1. Broadway vs Elvis (season premiere)
- 2. SK8Boarders
- 3. Battle of the Bands
- 4. Singer vs Dancer
- 5. Brother vs. Sister
- 6. Going to the Dogs
- 7. Multitaskers
- 8. Practical vs. Flowery
- 9. Double Trouble
- 10. Karate Kids
- 11. Hockey vs. Ringette
- 12. Early Riser vs. Late Sleeper
- 13. Clash of the Cooks
- 14. Out of the Fry Pan
- 15. Small vs. Tall
- 16. Word Warriors
- 17. Urban Artists
- 18. The Faux Show
- 19. Grossiators
- 20. Dance Dance Dance
- 21. Brawn vs. Brawn
- 22. Mad Scientists
- 23. The Soccer Princess vs. the Catboy
- 24. Helping Hands
- 25. Sing for Your Supper
- 26. Payback Time! (final episode)

== Broadcast ==
Surprise! It's Edible! Incredible! was broadcast in Canada on CBC Television, Discovery Kids, and BBC Kids. Outside of Canada, the series aired in several countries (minus USA)

== Cast ==
- Julie Zwillich
- Mike Paterson as Mr. Gross
- Alex Orlando
- DJ Killa Jewel (Season 1)
