= Sweat (Canadian TV series) =

Canadian television series

SWEAT is an OLN/TSN show hosted by Julie Zwillich that aired in 2003–2004.

Each of the 13 half-hour episodes of SWEAT features a different outdoor sport: kayaking, mountain biking, ice hockey, beach volleyball, soccer, windsurfing, rowing, Ultimate, triathlon, wakeboarding, snowboarding, telemark skiing and kiteboarding. Guest experts provide examples of the latest sport-specific gear, and techniques as well as provide nutrition and training tips for entry-level participation. Some of SWEAT's guest athletes include, Olympic beach volleyball bronze medallists John Child and Mark Heese, Canada’s young soccer superstar Kara Lang, snowboarding champion Alexa Loo and women's hockey Olympic gold medallist Sami Jo Small.
