= Elliot Lake Secondary School =

Location
- 303 Mississauga Avenue; Elliot Lake, Ontario, P5A 1E8; Canada; 46°22′34″N 82°39′40″W

Information
- School type: Public, high school
- Motto: Labor Omnia Vincit (Work Conquers All)
- Founded: 1957
- School board: Algoma District School Board
- Area trustee: Marie Murphy Foran
- School number: 908010
- Principal: Darryn Grant
- Grades: 9–12
- Enrollment: 483 (2009)
- Language: English
- Colours: Red, White
- Team name: Atoms
- Website: www.elss.ca

Elliot Lake Secondary School (ELSS) is a high school in Elliot Lake, Ontario, Canada. The school began in 1956 with 23 students and quickly grew to have 1193 students by 1990. The following year, the school only saw an enrolment of 899 students and the institution's population would continue to drop thereafter. As of 2022, the enrollment was 345.

In the 2021 Fraser Institute Ontario secondary school report cards, Elliot Lake Secondary School ranked 664/739 schools in Ontario.

== See also ==
- Education in Ontario
- List of secondary schools in Ontario
