= New Regime (Canadian band) =

- Origin: Toronto, Ontario, Canada
- Genres: New wave
- Years active: 1982–1987
- Label: RCA
- Past members: Kevin Connelly; Norm McMullen; Russell Walker; Jim MacDonald; Rick Lintlop; Rob Laidlaw; Jon James; Neil Taylor; Les Stroud

New Regime was a Canadian new wave band, active from 1982 to 1987. They released two albums on RCA Records during their lifetime, and toured as an opening act for Platinum Blonde in 1985.

== Background ==
The band was initially formed by vocalist Kevin Connelly, drummer Neil Taylor, and bassist Jon James who were high school friends. along with guitarist Bill Telep. Telep soon left the band, and was replaced by Les Stroud at the same time as keyboardist Tim Durnford joined; both Stroud and Durford had previously been collaborators with Connelly in a short-lived David Bowie tribute band, The Diamond Dogs. Stroud, Durnford and James later departed due to creative differences, and the band added bassist Rick Lintlop, guitarist Norm McMullen, and keyboardist Russell Walker.

== Career ==
Signed to RCA in 1984, they released their self-titled debut album in 1985. The album spawned the radio singles "Seduction", "Love in Motion", "Fools Cry", and "Treasure". "Seduction" peaked at #80 in the RPM singles chart the week of August 20, 1985, while none of the other singles charted. The album was also modestly successful on the Canadian charts, peaking at #87 in the RPM100 albums chart in the week of July 20, 1985. Producer Terry Brown was nominated for Producer of the Year at the Juno Awards of 1985 for his work on the album.

On December 31, 1985, the band played a New Year's Eve show at Maple Leaf Gardens in Toronto, as the opening act on a bill that also included Orchestral Manoeuvres in the Dark and Thompson Twins.

Walker and Lintlop were subsequently replaced by keyboardist Jim McDonald, formerly of Rational Youth, and bassist Rob Laidlaw. This lineup completed and toured behind the band's 1987 album The Race, which added some hard rock elements to the band's sound and was produced by Steve Webster. The album's lead single "Love and Satisfaction" also charted in RPM, peaking at #67 in the week of October 10, 1987.

The band provided the soundtrack to Season 4 Episode 4 (Roots and Wings) of the Canadian television series Danger Bay while also appearing in concert footage playing a fictional band called "Love Puppies" that the main characters go to see. The episode first aired on October 28, 1987.

The band broke up following The Race. Connelly reemerged in the 1990s with the solo album Son of the Sun before mounting a touring David Bowie tribute show titled "Life On Mars: The Sound and Vision of David Bowie" in the 2000s.

== Discography ==
- New Regime (1985)
- The Race (1987)
