= Survivorman =

Canadian wilderness survival television program

- Genre: Documentary (wilderness survival), Adventure
- Created by: Les Stroud
- Written by: Les Stroud
- Directed by: Les Stroud
- Starring: Les Stroud
- Country of origin: Canada
- Original language: English
- No. of seasons: 8
- No. of episodes: 51 (list of episodes)

Production
- Executive producer: Les Stroud
- Cinematography: Les Stroud
- Editor: Andy Peterson
- Camera setup: Les Stroud
- Running time: 44 minutes (not including commercials)
- Production companies: Cream Productions; Wilderness Spirit Productions

Original release
- Network: OLN
- Release: 6 April 2005 – 13 December 2016

Related
- Stranded

Survivorman is a Canadian-produced television program, broadcast in Canada on the Outdoor Life Network (OLN), and internationally on Discovery Channel and Science Channel. The title refers to the host of the show, Canadian filmmaker and survival expert Les Stroud, who uses survival skills and knowledge to survive alone for up to ten days (seven days during the first three seasons and ten days during seasons four and five), in remote locales where he brings with him little or no food, water, or equipment. Each location was scouted and planned extensively by Stroud and his team who consulted with survival specialists and natives of each area. The fact that Stroud films the episodes himself and endures the challenges of the wilderness, while dealing with the concomitant mental, emotional and physical stresses, is a major focus of the show.

== Production ==
During the videotaping of each episode, Stroud is alone and operates all the cameras himself, while his support team monitors him from a distance. He is equipped with only his clothes, camera equipment, his harmonica, a multi-tool, and often "everyday items" relevant to the episode's particular survival situation or locale. For safety purposes, Stroud carries an emergency satellite phone and normally has daily radio contact with his support crew that is always within rescue range. However, Stroud has stated that while videotaping several episodes, there were times when his emergency phone did not work, leaving him totally alone and has mentioned his concern that his rescue crew may become stranded with him. On a few occasions, Stroud has also been provided with a rifle for safety reasons or as part of the survival situation; in the first-season episode "Canadian Arctic", the local experts he consulted insisted that because of polar bears they would not let him go without a rifle.

Survivorman can be considered a sequel or spin-off to Stroud's earlier project, Stranded, a five-part series that was shown on the Canadian Discovery Channel in 2001.

Stroud paused the Survivorman series after the third season due to what he described as the significant physical toll of videotaping each episode. As of 2012, reruns from the first three seasons are still broadcast on OLN and Discovery.

On November 23, 2011, Stroud's official website announced the show would be returning for a series of specials in which he would "up the ante" by surviving alone in ten-day stretches, three more days than in the original episodes. Part one of the first hour-long special was broadcast on June 30, 2012, on OLN. It was announced that Stroud would be producing another Survivorman season for OLN to be aired in April/May 2015.

== Episode themes ==
In each episode, Stroud places himself in a unique survival situation. The show is meant to demonstrate how one might survive alone, in a remote location, with minimal supplies until being rescued. Finding food, water, and materials to make fire and shelter pose the main challenges of each episode.

According to its official website, the show includes Stroud dealing with the aftermath of unsuccessful or inappropriate survival techniques and decisions. The reasons for these errors can include time limitations, being unfamiliar with a technique, or misjudging weather conditions, all frequently encountered by people in survival situations. While acknowledging the errors and the negative effect on his emotional state that they can create, Stroud usually remains calm, which is described as being vital to successful survival.

In addition to the physical challenges posed by each survival situation, Stroud confronts the psychological effects of isolation, physical injury, and exhaustion. Throughout the episode, Stroud narrates to the camera, commenting on his physical and psychological state, providing survival tips, and making jokes. Stroud also often dismantles available equipment (e.g., bicycle, snowmobile, airplane) that he happens to come across in the wild and puts it to another practical use.

Prior to each episode, Stroud relies heavily on local experts to brief him on flora and fauna and key survival techniques unique to that particular location. Drawing upon this local knowledge and guidance, Stroud shows the audience how to find viable sources of nourishment, avoid dangerous or unhealthy ones, and utilize them appropriately and efficiently. Stroud frequently explains that gathering food in this manner should be reserved for true survival situations in order to preserve the environment.

Stroud's survival situations are reported to have helped numerous people in real-life situations who found themselves stranded in the elements.

== Videotaping ==
Except for footage of him arriving at his new setting, and being retrieved at the end of the week, the content of each episode is taped entirely by Stroud himself using several DV cameras that he must carry with him everywhere that he goes (he later switched to a number of HDV cameras). The burden of having to carry, place, and retrieve the camera equipment for each shot adds to the challenge and difficulty of each survival situation. In several episodes, Stroud chooses to leave a camera behind, videotaping him as he departs the area. In a different episode taking place in the Amazon, Stroud is forced to flee his camp and abandon all but two of his cameras due to fear of a stalking jaguar. His camera and audio gear typically weigh about 50 pounds (23 kg) in total. During the "Behind the Scenes" episode, Stroud explains that "setting up or tearing down all of my camera gear takes about 65% of my time." The episode also explains that Stroud and his team extensively scout their locations ahead of time and consult with survivalists and natives to the area. The goal is both to ensure Stroud's safety and to sketch out interesting scenarios and techniques that can be illustrated on the show. He later records a voice-over commentary in the studio, where he explains his decision-making process and details of how he accomplished various tasks.

On 16 July 2007, Stroud and a support crew of four in the nearby safety camp were cited by the United States National Park Service for commercial videotaping without a permit at Taroka Arm, a seldom-visited area at Kenai Fjords National Park in Alaska. Investigators found a driftwood shelter surrounded by multiple cameras on the beach. The support crew was camped near a sensitive archaeological site. Stroud paid the required application, location, and monitoring fees, totaling approximately US$2,800.

In September 2012, Stroud stated in a compilation show (Survivorman Top-10) that at one time he had contracted a parasitic worm infestation in his mouth that lasted over a year. Stroud stated that he was not sure of the origin of the malady, though he believes that the source was from Georgia swamp turtle meat (season 1, episode 4).

== Episodes ==
Season	Episodes	Originally aired			DVD release dates
Season	Episodes	Season premiere	Season finale	Network	Region 1
1	10	6 April 2005	8 June 2005	Outdoor Life Network, Discovery Channel	2006
2	7	10 August 2007	21 September 2007	Outdoor Life Network, Discovery Channel	2008
3	6	7 November 2008	19 December 2008	Outdoor Life Network, Discovery Channel	2009
4	4	30 June 2012	21 July 2012	Science Channel, Outdoor Life Network	2013
5	8	1 January 2014	26 March 2014	Science Channel, Travel + Escape	TBA
6	7	1 April 2015	13 May 2015	Science Channel, OLN	TBA
7	7	7 November 2015	19 December 2015	Science Channel, OLN	TBA

== Home releases ==
Cover art	DVD name	No# of episodes	Release date
	Season 1	10	2006
	Season 2	7	2008
	Season 3	6	2009
	Season 4	4	2012

== See also ==
- Happy People: A Year in the Taiga, a documentary made by Werner Herzog and Dmitry Vasyukov about subsistence hunters in the Russian boreal forest
- Man vs. Wild with Bear Grylls
- Alone
- Richard Proenneke, an American woodsman who filmed his life and survival in the Alaskan wilderness
- Robinsonade
