= Les Stroud =

Canadian survival expert

- Born: 20 October 1961 (age 65); Etobicoke, Ontario, Canada
- Occupations: Filmmaker, musician
- Spouse: Susan Jamison (1994–2008)
- Children: 2

Les Stroud (born 20 October 1961) is a Canadian survival expert, filmmaker and musician best known as the creator, writer, producer, director, cameraman and host of the television series Survivorman. Stroud was named Chief Scout by Scouts Canada on 22 November 2021. After a short career behind the scenes in the music industry, Stroud became a full-time wilderness guide, survival instructor and musician based in Huntsville, Ontario. Stroud has produced survival-themed programming for The Outdoor Life Network, The Discovery Channel, The Science Channel, and YTV. The survival skills imparted from watching Stroud's television programs have been cited by several people as the reason they lived through harrowing wilderness ordeals.

== Biography ==
Stroud was born in the Mimico neighbourhood of Toronto and graduated from Mimico High School. He went on to complete the Music Industry Arts program at Fanshawe College in London, Ontario. Stroud worked for several years at the Toronto-based music video channel MuchMusic, and as a songwriter for the band New Regime before a Temagami canoe trip sparked a career change. During this time he also worked as garbage collector for the City of Toronto.

In 1990, Stroud became a guide for Black Feather Wilderness Adventures leading canoe excursions into the Northern Ontario wilds. It was also during this time while on a survival course he met his future wife, photographer Sue Jamison. They married in 1994 and together left for a year-long honeymoon in the remote Wabakimi area of Ontario which was to become the basis of the documentary Snowshoes and Solitude. Afterwards, the couple moved to Yellowknife in the Northwest Territories where Stroud was employed as an outdoor instructor to special needs individuals of aboriginal descent. Stroud and Jamison then settled in Huntsville, Ontario where they had two children and started both the outdoor instructional outfit Wilderness Voice and the media company Wilderness Spirit Productions.

Inspired by the popularity of the television show Survivor, Stroud pitched a more authentic version of the show to The Discovery Channel Canada. Stroud produced two programs titled One Week in the Wilderness and Winter in the Wilderness for @discovery.ca in 2001. The success of these specials led to the development of Survivorman, a show that followed a similar format of leaving Stroud on his own, with minimal equipment, in the wilderness to videotape his survival experience.

== Film and television ==
After his marriage to Jamison in 1994, the two of them spent one year in the Canadian wilderness to attempt a Paleolithic existence. They travelled to Goldsborough Lake (50°41′55″N 89°20′46″W) deep in the Wabakimi, first building a tipi then an attached A-frame while using no metal, plastic, or otherwise manufactured tools. For the first half of the year, they took a store of traditional foods such as wild rice, squash, beaver and moose meat, bear fat, and maple sugar. In late September, Stroud's friends Doug Getgood and Fred Rowe brought in food for the next six months and chopped firewood for the couple. Stroud and Jamison built and equipped a winter cabin using an axe, a modern bow saw, and a trapper's tin wood stove left by Getgood and Rowe, along with a metal pot they found.

Family and medical emergencies brought them out of the bush on three occasions. Once when Stroud's father was dying from cancer, another when they both went to be treated for giardiasis, and again when Jamison had a miscarriage. Stroud filmed their primitive living experience and released the 50 minute documentary, Snowshoes and Solitude, which was named Best Documentary at the Muskoka Film Festival and Best Film at the Waterwalker Film Festival.

In 2001, Stroud produced two one-hour specials for the science news show @discovery.ca. These segments follow the same format as Survivorman with Stroud filming his own survival in the wilderness. They were originally broadcast as daily segments over the course of one week but were repackaged as two one-hour specials titled Stranded. The popularity of these pilots spawned the show Survivorman. Stroud produced 23 episodes of the show which began airing in 2004. Stroud also composed and performed the opening theme music of Survivorman.

In 2006, Stroud produced a 90-minute special documenting his family's journey to building an off-the-grid home. The show, Off the Grid with Les Stroud, chronicled the process of buying property and refitting an old farm house with solar and wind power, a raincatcher and well, as well as the adjustments the Stroud family had to make to adapt to this style of living. Stroud has made multiple television appearances including on The Late Late Show with Craig Ferguson, The View, The Ellen DeGeneres Show, and Larry King Live.

Stroud has also hosted an episode of the Discovery channel show I Shouldn't Be Alive titled Lost In The Snow, which aired during its first season and the television program Surviving Urban Disasters, which aired on the Science Channel and the 20th annual Shark Week on the Discovery Channel.

In 2010, Stroud hosted and produced the Gemini nominated hit kids TV series Survive This and Survive This 2 (YTV, Cartoon Network) that takes teens into the wilderness to teach them how to survive by giving them some instruction and challenging them with survival scenarios. Stroud's follow-up show to Survivorman was titled Beyond Survival with Les Stroud and debuted in 2010.

On 27 April 2018, National Geographic aired Stroud's Alaska's Grizzly Gauntlet on their NGW channel. In four episodes, Stroud explores the survival methods and social structure of the Kodiak brown bear. Since 2020, Stroud has collaborated with chef Paul Rogalski on their PBS series Wild Harvest, where Stroud forages for wild ingredients and challenges Rogalski to use them in the preparation of different dishes in each episode.

== Music ==
In addition to film making and wilderness survival, Stroud has also worked in the music industry as a professional musician. After graduation, Stroud worked both as an associate producer for the nascent music channel MuchMusic as well as production manager on music videos for artists such as Rush and Corey Hart. During this time Stroud also played in the David Bowie cover band Diamond Dogs and played lead guitar and composed music for his band New Regime which signed with RCA Records shortly after Stroud left the band.

As frequently illustrated in his show Survivorman, Stroud is considered an exceptional blues harmonica player. This instrument is featured prominently in his self-titled debut CD which has been described as "a collection of diverse roots/blues and traditional folk, acoustic music that reflects the uniquely northern spirit of freedom and adventure." Several songs off of this album can be downloaded from his official site. Stroud has performed in and around the Muskoka area and at the Orillia Blues Festival and Toronto Beaches International Jazz Festival.

Stroud and The Northern Pikes have struck up a musical collaboration under the name Les Stroud and the Pikes. Throughout 2005 and 2006 they performed together live several times, and an EP born from this collaboration entitled Long Walk Home was released in the spring of 2007.

== Awards ==
Stroud has received several accolades as a musician. He has won "Best Acoustic/Folk Act", "Best Blues Act", and "Best Overall" awards at the Spirit of the North music festival in New Liskeard, Ontario.

Stroud's documentary Snowshoes and Solitude was named Best Documentary at the Muskoka Film Festival and Best Film at the Waterwalker Film Festival.

Stroud was nominated for six Gemini Awards for his work on Survivorman. In 2010, Stroud and his production team was nominated for Best Children's or Youth Non-Fiction Program or Series for Survive This.

== Personal life ==
Stroud has extensive experience with survival and primitive living skills, initially training with expert David Arama. He went on to study with many others including John "Prairie Wolf" McPherson.

Stroud has been an active participant in adventure racing and has competed at the Canadian championships.

In late 2008, Stroud and his wife, Sue Jamison, separated.
