= W. C. Eaket Secondary School =

Coordinates: 46.1885°N 82.9471°W

- School crest
- 147 Woodward Avenue, Blind River, Ontario P0R 1B0; Canada

Information
- Type: Secondary school
- Motto: "Nulli Secundus"
- Established: 1958
- School district: Algoma District School Board
- Principal: Brian Beauchamp
- Faculty: 59
- Enrollment: 130 (2019/2020)
- Colours: Blue and Gold
- Mascot: Bowfin the Lion
- Website: http://eaket.adsb.on.ca/

William Clarence Eaket Secondary School, also known as Eaket, is the only English language high school in Blind River, Ontario, Canada. It is operated by the Algoma District School Board, and as of 2006 it had 312 students and 59 faculty members. The only other high school in Blind River is École Secondaire Jeunesse Nord (Northern Youth Secondary School), which is a solely French-language school.

The school was founded in 1958 as Blind River District High School.

== See also ==
- Education in Ontario
- List of secondary schools in Ontario
