= Bravo (Canadian TV channel) =

Canadian television network

- Country: Canada
- Broadcast area: Nationwide
- Headquarters: Toronto, Ontario

Programming
- Picture format: 1080i HDTV (downscaled to letterboxed 480i for the SDTV feed)

Ownership
- Owner: Rogers Sports & Media (branding licensed from Comcast / NBCUniversal)
- Sister channels: Sportsnet; FX Canada; FXX Canada; Citytv; TSC

History
- Launched: October 17, 1997; 28 years ago
- Former names: Outdoor Life Network (1997–2008); OLN (2008–2024)

Links
- Website: Bravo

Bravo is a Canadian English-language discretionary specialty channel owned by Rogers Sports & Media, with its name licensed from the U.S. cable network owned by Comcast's NBCUniversal. The channel primally airs reality and lifestyle series targeted at 25-to-54-year-old women.

The channel launched on October 17, 1997 as OLN (Outdoor Life Network), and was originally dedicated to factual-based adventure and outdoors programming. It was owned in a joint venture between Rogers, Baton Broadcasting (Note: which would later become CTVglobemedia and Bell Media), and the U.S. Outdoor Life Network (owned by Comcast); with the brand licensed from the owners of Outdoor Life magazine. Rogers took sole ownership of the channel in 2008.

By the 2010s, with OLN in the U.S. having since abandoned its original format in favour of becoming a sports channel (Versus, later NBCSN), and the repeal of the CRTC's genre protection rules, OLN had drifted towards becoming a generalist, men's interest channel, with most of its schedule devoted to reality television series and other Rogers library programming.

The channel would adopt its current name on September 1, 2024, as part of a brand licensing and programming agreement with NBCUniversal.

== History ==
=== Bravo in Canada before 2019 ===
CHUM Limited applied to the Canadian Radio-television and Telecommunications Commission (CRTC) for a license to operate Bravo. In June 1994, CHUM's application for Bravo was approved, citing its nature of service as focusing on "performance and drama programming, as well as documentary and discussion". On January 1, 1995, Bravo went on the air and this channel originally focused on performing arts, drama, and independent film. The name was first licensed to CHUM from Rainbow Media (now known as AMC Networks) before selling the stake to NBC.

After CTVglobemedia's acquisition of CHUM Limited in 2007, including Bravo, the channel increasingly shifted its focus toward more television and film dramas (such as Criminal Minds), and lessened its focus on arts programming. The channel was renamed to CTV Drama Channel in 2019, aligning it with the branding of the CTV Television Network.

=== OLN ===
Meanwhile, OLN was first licensed in September 1996 as Outdoor Life by the Canadian Radio-television and Telecommunications Commission (CRTC), and the channel was launched on October 17, 1997, as the Outdoor Life Network. Its initial owners were Baton Broadcasting, Rogers Media, and the U.S. network of the same name (which was later acquired by Comcast).

In April 2006, Comcast announced that it would be relaunching the U.S. Outdoor Life Network as Versus (later to be known as NBCSN) in the Fall of 2006. Due to restrictions in its CRTC license that required it to maintain a focus on outdoors programming at the time, and because Rogers already operated mainstream sports networks under the Sportsnet brand, the Canadian version did not follow the suit of its American counterpart to become a mainstream sports channel.

On November 16, 2007, it was announced that Rogers would acquire the remaining interests in OLN from both CTVglobemedia and Comcast, leaving Rogers as the sole owner of OLN. The deal was approved by the CRTC on July 7, 2008, and was finalized on August 1, 2008; Rogers would take operational control on August 31, 2008.

On June 24, 2011, OLN launched a high definition feed.

During the 2010s, enabled by the CRTC's deprecation of the genre protection rules, OLN would phase out outdoors-related programming, and shift its focus towards general interest reality shows. OLN would adopt a new logo and slogan, "Outrageous Characters—Real Life", in 2012, while continuing to produce its own original programming, such as Get Stuffed (a reality travel documentary series starring escape artist Dean Gunnarson) and Storage Wars Canada.

While OLN did not become a sports channel, it would air a limited amount of sports programming; including coverage of the Tour de France. The network was also part of CTV and Rogers's coverage of the 2010 Winter Olympics and 2012 Summer Olympics. Since 2022, OLN has also served as an overflow outlet for WWE's weekly professional wrestling programming in the event of scheduling conflicts with Sportsnet 360.

=== The return of Bravo ===
In June 2024, Rogers announced a licensing agreement with Comcast subsidiary NBCUniversal to relaunch the Bravo brand in Canada in September of that year. It would be Rogers' third collaboration with Comcast after the relaunch of G4TechTV Canada. (Note: Originally a joint venture with the former American cable channel TechTV prior to its acquisition by G4 owner Comcast, and merger with NBCUniversal's G4 Media) On August 28, 2024, it was confirmed that OLN would be rebranded as Bravo on September 1. Prior to the relaunch of Bravo in Canada, most of its programming was aired by Corus Entertainment channel Slice.

== Programming ==
As with the U.S. counterpart, Bravo's programming schedule primarily includes programming originally produced for the American channel, particularly reality content such as the Real Housewives, Top Chef, and Below Deck franchises. The channel currently airs repeats of Citytv's Bachelor in Paradise Canada during the early morning hours to fulfill Canadian content obligations.

=== Original programming as OLN ===
- Beyond Survival
- The Liquidator
- Mantracker
- Survivorman
- Sweat
- Storage Wars Canada
- Angry Planet

== See also ==
- Bravo (United States)
  - 7Bravo (Australia)
  - Bravo (New Zealand)
- NBCSN, the former name of OLN in the U.S. existed from 1995 to 2021.
